

280001–280100 

|-bgcolor=#d6d6d6
| 280001 ||  || — || October 23, 2001 || Socorro || LINEAR || — || align=right | 4.8 km || 
|-id=002 bgcolor=#fefefe
| 280002 ||  || — || October 23, 2001 || Socorro || LINEAR || NYS || align=right | 1.1 km || 
|-id=003 bgcolor=#fefefe
| 280003 ||  || — || October 23, 2001 || Socorro || LINEAR || NYS || align=right data-sort-value="0.86" | 860 m || 
|-id=004 bgcolor=#d6d6d6
| 280004 ||  || — || October 24, 2001 || Socorro || LINEAR || ALA || align=right | 5.8 km || 
|-id=005 bgcolor=#fefefe
| 280005 ||  || — || October 18, 2001 || Palomar || NEAT || NYS || align=right data-sort-value="0.90" | 900 m || 
|-id=006 bgcolor=#fefefe
| 280006 ||  || — || October 18, 2001 || Kitt Peak || Spacewatch || — || align=right data-sort-value="0.65" | 650 m || 
|-id=007 bgcolor=#d6d6d6
| 280007 ||  || — || October 19, 2001 || Palomar || NEAT || HYG || align=right | 3.5 km || 
|-id=008 bgcolor=#fefefe
| 280008 ||  || — || October 21, 2001 || Socorro || LINEAR || FLO || align=right data-sort-value="0.83" | 830 m || 
|-id=009 bgcolor=#fefefe
| 280009 ||  || — || November 9, 2001 || Socorro || LINEAR || — || align=right | 1.1 km || 
|-id=010 bgcolor=#fefefe
| 280010 ||  || — || November 9, 2001 || Socorro || LINEAR || NYS || align=right data-sort-value="0.77" | 770 m || 
|-id=011 bgcolor=#fefefe
| 280011 ||  || — || November 10, 2001 || Socorro || LINEAR || — || align=right | 1.3 km || 
|-id=012 bgcolor=#fefefe
| 280012 ||  || — || November 12, 2001 || Kitt Peak || Spacewatch || V || align=right data-sort-value="0.78" | 780 m || 
|-id=013 bgcolor=#fefefe
| 280013 ||  || — || November 9, 2001 || Socorro || LINEAR || H || align=right data-sort-value="0.74" | 740 m || 
|-id=014 bgcolor=#d6d6d6
| 280014 ||  || — || November 10, 2001 || Palomar || NEAT || — || align=right | 5.0 km || 
|-id=015 bgcolor=#fefefe
| 280015 ||  || — || November 12, 2001 || Socorro || LINEAR || — || align=right | 1.2 km || 
|-id=016 bgcolor=#FA8072
| 280016 ||  || — || November 18, 2001 || Socorro || LINEAR || H || align=right data-sort-value="0.74" | 740 m || 
|-id=017 bgcolor=#FA8072
| 280017 ||  || — || November 18, 2001 || Socorro || LINEAR || — || align=right | 3.2 km || 
|-id=018 bgcolor=#fefefe
| 280018 ||  || — || November 17, 2001 || Socorro || LINEAR || H || align=right data-sort-value="0.67" | 670 m || 
|-id=019 bgcolor=#fefefe
| 280019 ||  || — || November 17, 2001 || Socorro || LINEAR || V || align=right data-sort-value="0.84" | 840 m || 
|-id=020 bgcolor=#E9E9E9
| 280020 ||  || — || November 17, 2001 || Socorro || LINEAR || — || align=right data-sort-value="0.98" | 980 m || 
|-id=021 bgcolor=#fefefe
| 280021 ||  || — || November 17, 2001 || Socorro || LINEAR || — || align=right | 1.2 km || 
|-id=022 bgcolor=#d6d6d6
| 280022 ||  || — || November 19, 2001 || Socorro || LINEAR || EOS || align=right | 2.9 km || 
|-id=023 bgcolor=#d6d6d6
| 280023 ||  || — || November 17, 2001 || Kitt Peak || Spacewatch || SYL7:4 || align=right | 4.4 km || 
|-id=024 bgcolor=#d6d6d6
| 280024 ||  || — || December 7, 2001 || Socorro || LINEAR || — || align=right | 5.1 km || 
|-id=025 bgcolor=#fefefe
| 280025 ||  || — || December 9, 2001 || Socorro || LINEAR || — || align=right | 2.8 km || 
|-id=026 bgcolor=#fefefe
| 280026 ||  || — || December 10, 2001 || Socorro || LINEAR || — || align=right | 1.1 km || 
|-id=027 bgcolor=#fefefe
| 280027 ||  || — || December 14, 2001 || Socorro || LINEAR || V || align=right data-sort-value="0.95" | 950 m || 
|-id=028 bgcolor=#fefefe
| 280028 ||  || — || December 14, 2001 || Socorro || LINEAR || MAS || align=right data-sort-value="0.91" | 910 m || 
|-id=029 bgcolor=#fefefe
| 280029 ||  || — || December 14, 2001 || Socorro || LINEAR || — || align=right | 1.4 km || 
|-id=030 bgcolor=#fefefe
| 280030 ||  || — || December 14, 2001 || Socorro || LINEAR || MAS || align=right | 1.0 km || 
|-id=031 bgcolor=#E9E9E9
| 280031 ||  || — || December 14, 2001 || Socorro || LINEAR || — || align=right | 1.1 km || 
|-id=032 bgcolor=#E9E9E9
| 280032 ||  || — || December 14, 2001 || Socorro || LINEAR || RAF || align=right | 2.4 km || 
|-id=033 bgcolor=#d6d6d6
| 280033 ||  || — || December 11, 2001 || Socorro || LINEAR || TIR || align=right | 4.2 km || 
|-id=034 bgcolor=#d6d6d6
| 280034 ||  || — || December 11, 2001 || Socorro || LINEAR || THB || align=right | 5.4 km || 
|-id=035 bgcolor=#fefefe
| 280035 ||  || — || December 15, 2001 || Socorro || LINEAR || NYS || align=right data-sort-value="0.86" | 860 m || 
|-id=036 bgcolor=#E9E9E9
| 280036 ||  || — || December 14, 2001 || Socorro || LINEAR || EUN || align=right | 1.6 km || 
|-id=037 bgcolor=#fefefe
| 280037 ||  || — || December 18, 2001 || Socorro || LINEAR || — || align=right | 2.0 km || 
|-id=038 bgcolor=#E9E9E9
| 280038 ||  || — || December 18, 2001 || Socorro || LINEAR || — || align=right | 1.4 km || 
|-id=039 bgcolor=#fefefe
| 280039 ||  || — || December 17, 2001 || Socorro || LINEAR || — || align=right | 1.0 km || 
|-id=040 bgcolor=#E9E9E9
| 280040 ||  || — || December 20, 2001 || Palomar || NEAT || — || align=right | 1.9 km || 
|-id=041 bgcolor=#E9E9E9
| 280041 ||  || — || December 19, 2001 || Palomar || NEAT || — || align=right | 2.0 km || 
|-id=042 bgcolor=#FA8072
| 280042 ||  || — || January 3, 2002 || Socorro || LINEAR || — || align=right | 2.3 km || 
|-id=043 bgcolor=#E9E9E9
| 280043 ||  || — || January 9, 2002 || Socorro || LINEAR || — || align=right | 1.5 km || 
|-id=044 bgcolor=#E9E9E9
| 280044 ||  || — || January 9, 2002 || Socorro || LINEAR || — || align=right | 1.3 km || 
|-id=045 bgcolor=#E9E9E9
| 280045 ||  || — || January 11, 2002 || Socorro || LINEAR || — || align=right | 1.5 km || 
|-id=046 bgcolor=#E9E9E9
| 280046 ||  || — || January 9, 2002 || Socorro || LINEAR || — || align=right | 1.6 km || 
|-id=047 bgcolor=#E9E9E9
| 280047 ||  || — || January 9, 2002 || Socorro || LINEAR || — || align=right | 1.3 km || 
|-id=048 bgcolor=#fefefe
| 280048 ||  || — || January 8, 2002 || Socorro || LINEAR || H || align=right data-sort-value="0.85" | 850 m || 
|-id=049 bgcolor=#E9E9E9
| 280049 ||  || — || January 9, 2002 || Socorro || LINEAR || — || align=right | 1.2 km || 
|-id=050 bgcolor=#E9E9E9
| 280050 ||  || — || January 14, 2002 || Socorro || LINEAR || MIT || align=right | 2.7 km || 
|-id=051 bgcolor=#d6d6d6
| 280051 ||  || — || January 19, 2002 || Socorro || LINEAR || — || align=right | 4.8 km || 
|-id=052 bgcolor=#E9E9E9
| 280052 ||  || — || January 18, 2002 || Socorro || LINEAR || RAF || align=right | 1.5 km || 
|-id=053 bgcolor=#E9E9E9
| 280053 ||  || — || February 5, 2002 || Palomar || NEAT || — || align=right | 2.1 km || 
|-id=054 bgcolor=#E9E9E9
| 280054 ||  || — || February 6, 2002 || Socorro || LINEAR || — || align=right | 2.3 km || 
|-id=055 bgcolor=#E9E9E9
| 280055 ||  || — || February 7, 2002 || Socorro || LINEAR || — || align=right | 1.7 km || 
|-id=056 bgcolor=#fefefe
| 280056 ||  || — || February 7, 2002 || Socorro || LINEAR || FLO || align=right data-sort-value="0.96" | 960 m || 
|-id=057 bgcolor=#E9E9E9
| 280057 ||  || — || February 6, 2002 || Socorro || LINEAR || MIT || align=right | 2.7 km || 
|-id=058 bgcolor=#d6d6d6
| 280058 ||  || — || February 7, 2002 || Socorro || LINEAR || EMA || align=right | 4.4 km || 
|-id=059 bgcolor=#E9E9E9
| 280059 ||  || — || February 7, 2002 || Socorro || LINEAR || — || align=right | 1.3 km || 
|-id=060 bgcolor=#fefefe
| 280060 ||  || — || February 7, 2002 || Socorro || LINEAR || — || align=right | 1.2 km || 
|-id=061 bgcolor=#fefefe
| 280061 ||  || — || February 7, 2002 || Socorro || LINEAR || FLO || align=right data-sort-value="0.87" | 870 m || 
|-id=062 bgcolor=#E9E9E9
| 280062 ||  || — || February 7, 2002 || Socorro || LINEAR || RAF || align=right | 1.1 km || 
|-id=063 bgcolor=#E9E9E9
| 280063 ||  || — || February 10, 2002 || Socorro || LINEAR || — || align=right | 1.6 km || 
|-id=064 bgcolor=#E9E9E9
| 280064 ||  || — || February 7, 2002 || Socorro || LINEAR || — || align=right | 1.0 km || 
|-id=065 bgcolor=#E9E9E9
| 280065 ||  || — || February 7, 2002 || Socorro || LINEAR || — || align=right | 1.5 km || 
|-id=066 bgcolor=#E9E9E9
| 280066 ||  || — || February 10, 2002 || Socorro || LINEAR || — || align=right | 1.3 km || 
|-id=067 bgcolor=#E9E9E9
| 280067 ||  || — || February 10, 2002 || Socorro || LINEAR || — || align=right | 1.3 km || 
|-id=068 bgcolor=#E9E9E9
| 280068 ||  || — || February 6, 2002 || Socorro || LINEAR || — || align=right | 1.1 km || 
|-id=069 bgcolor=#E9E9E9
| 280069 ||  || — || February 6, 2002 || Socorro || LINEAR || — || align=right | 4.5 km || 
|-id=070 bgcolor=#E9E9E9
| 280070 ||  || — || February 10, 2002 || Socorro || LINEAR || — || align=right | 1.1 km || 
|-id=071 bgcolor=#E9E9E9
| 280071 ||  || — || February 10, 2002 || Socorro || LINEAR || — || align=right | 1.4 km || 
|-id=072 bgcolor=#C2FFFF
| 280072 ||  || — || February 10, 2002 || Socorro || LINEAR || L4 || align=right | 14 km || 
|-id=073 bgcolor=#E9E9E9
| 280073 ||  || — || February 11, 2002 || Socorro || LINEAR || — || align=right | 1.7 km || 
|-id=074 bgcolor=#E9E9E9
| 280074 ||  || — || February 4, 2002 || Palomar || NEAT || — || align=right | 2.6 km || 
|-id=075 bgcolor=#E9E9E9
| 280075 ||  || — || February 6, 2002 || Palomar || NEAT || — || align=right | 1.6 km || 
|-id=076 bgcolor=#E9E9E9
| 280076 ||  || — || February 10, 2002 || Socorro || LINEAR || — || align=right | 2.9 km || 
|-id=077 bgcolor=#E9E9E9
| 280077 ||  || — || February 11, 2002 || Socorro || LINEAR || HNA || align=right | 2.8 km || 
|-id=078 bgcolor=#fefefe
| 280078 ||  || — || February 14, 2002 || Haleakala || NEAT || — || align=right | 2.2 km || 
|-id=079 bgcolor=#E9E9E9
| 280079 ||  || — || February 6, 2002 || Socorro || LINEAR || — || align=right | 1.9 km || 
|-id=080 bgcolor=#E9E9E9
| 280080 ||  || — || February 7, 2002 || Anderson Mesa || LONEOS || — || align=right | 1.7 km || 
|-id=081 bgcolor=#E9E9E9
| 280081 ||  || — || February 9, 2002 || Kitt Peak || Spacewatch || — || align=right | 1.1 km || 
|-id=082 bgcolor=#E9E9E9
| 280082 ||  || — || February 10, 2002 || Kitt Peak || Spacewatch || — || align=right | 1.0 km || 
|-id=083 bgcolor=#E9E9E9
| 280083 ||  || — || February 10, 2002 || Socorro || LINEAR || — || align=right | 2.3 km || 
|-id=084 bgcolor=#E9E9E9
| 280084 ||  || — || February 10, 2002 || Socorro || LINEAR || — || align=right | 1.8 km || 
|-id=085 bgcolor=#E9E9E9
| 280085 ||  || — || February 11, 2002 || Socorro || LINEAR || — || align=right | 1.6 km || 
|-id=086 bgcolor=#E9E9E9
| 280086 ||  || — || February 6, 2002 || Palomar || NEAT || — || align=right data-sort-value="0.98" | 980 m || 
|-id=087 bgcolor=#E9E9E9
| 280087 ||  || — || February 19, 2002 || Socorro || LINEAR || — || align=right | 2.0 km || 
|-id=088 bgcolor=#E9E9E9
| 280088 ||  || — || February 19, 2002 || Socorro || LINEAR || — || align=right | 4.4 km || 
|-id=089 bgcolor=#E9E9E9
| 280089 ||  || — || March 6, 2002 || Palomar || NEAT || — || align=right | 2.4 km || 
|-id=090 bgcolor=#E9E9E9
| 280090 ||  || — || March 5, 2002 || Kitt Peak || Spacewatch || — || align=right | 1.3 km || 
|-id=091 bgcolor=#E9E9E9
| 280091 ||  || — || March 10, 2002 || Anderson Mesa || LONEOS || — || align=right | 3.2 km || 
|-id=092 bgcolor=#E9E9E9
| 280092 ||  || — || March 13, 2002 || Socorro || LINEAR || — || align=right | 3.3 km || 
|-id=093 bgcolor=#E9E9E9
| 280093 ||  || — || March 13, 2002 || Socorro || LINEAR || — || align=right | 1.2 km || 
|-id=094 bgcolor=#E9E9E9
| 280094 ||  || — || March 13, 2002 || Socorro || LINEAR || KAZ || align=right | 1.3 km || 
|-id=095 bgcolor=#E9E9E9
| 280095 ||  || — || March 14, 2002 || Palomar || NEAT || — || align=right | 2.7 km || 
|-id=096 bgcolor=#E9E9E9
| 280096 ||  || — || March 9, 2002 || Anderson Mesa || LONEOS || — || align=right | 1.6 km || 
|-id=097 bgcolor=#E9E9E9
| 280097 ||  || — || March 10, 2002 || Anderson Mesa || LONEOS || — || align=right | 2.1 km || 
|-id=098 bgcolor=#d6d6d6
| 280098 ||  || — || March 12, 2002 || Anderson Mesa || LONEOS || — || align=right | 4.1 km || 
|-id=099 bgcolor=#E9E9E9
| 280099 ||  || — || March 13, 2002 || Palomar || NEAT || — || align=right | 1.9 km || 
|-id=100 bgcolor=#E9E9E9
| 280100 ||  || — || March 12, 2002 || Palomar || NEAT || — || align=right | 1.5 km || 
|}

280101–280200 

|-bgcolor=#E9E9E9
| 280101 ||  || — || March 16, 2002 || Kitt Peak || Spacewatch || — || align=right | 1.1 km || 
|-id=102 bgcolor=#E9E9E9
| 280102 ||  || — || March 17, 2002 || Haleakala || NEAT || — || align=right | 3.9 km || 
|-id=103 bgcolor=#E9E9E9
| 280103 ||  || — || March 18, 2002 || Haleakala || NEAT || RAF || align=right | 1.3 km || 
|-id=104 bgcolor=#E9E9E9
| 280104 ||  || — || March 21, 2002 || Palomar || NEAT || — || align=right | 1.8 km || 
|-id=105 bgcolor=#E9E9E9
| 280105 ||  || — || April 5, 2002 || Anderson Mesa || LONEOS || — || align=right | 1.6 km || 
|-id=106 bgcolor=#fefefe
| 280106 ||  || — || April 8, 2002 || Palomar || NEAT || — || align=right data-sort-value="0.83" | 830 m || 
|-id=107 bgcolor=#E9E9E9
| 280107 ||  || — || April 9, 2002 || Anderson Mesa || LONEOS || — || align=right | 2.4 km || 
|-id=108 bgcolor=#E9E9E9
| 280108 ||  || — || April 9, 2002 || Socorro || LINEAR || ADE || align=right | 2.4 km || 
|-id=109 bgcolor=#E9E9E9
| 280109 ||  || — || April 10, 2002 || Socorro || LINEAR || — || align=right | 3.3 km || 
|-id=110 bgcolor=#fefefe
| 280110 ||  || — || April 10, 2002 || Palomar || NEAT || — || align=right | 1.2 km || 
|-id=111 bgcolor=#E9E9E9
| 280111 ||  || — || April 11, 2002 || Anderson Mesa || LONEOS || EUN || align=right | 1.9 km || 
|-id=112 bgcolor=#fefefe
| 280112 ||  || — || April 11, 2002 || Palomar || NEAT || — || align=right | 1.3 km || 
|-id=113 bgcolor=#E9E9E9
| 280113 ||  || — || April 12, 2002 || Socorro || LINEAR || — || align=right | 3.2 km || 
|-id=114 bgcolor=#E9E9E9
| 280114 ||  || — || April 12, 2002 || Palomar || NEAT || — || align=right | 1.8 km || 
|-id=115 bgcolor=#E9E9E9
| 280115 ||  || — || April 11, 2002 || Palomar || NEAT || ADE || align=right | 2.9 km || 
|-id=116 bgcolor=#E9E9E9
| 280116 ||  || — || April 13, 2002 || Palomar || NEAT || — || align=right | 2.0 km || 
|-id=117 bgcolor=#E9E9E9
| 280117 ||  || — || April 16, 2002 || Socorro || LINEAR || EUN || align=right | 1.8 km || 
|-id=118 bgcolor=#d6d6d6
| 280118 ||  || — || May 4, 2002 || Desert Eagle || W. K. Y. Yeung || — || align=right | 6.6 km || 
|-id=119 bgcolor=#E9E9E9
| 280119 ||  || — || May 5, 2002 || Palomar || NEAT || — || align=right | 3.0 km || 
|-id=120 bgcolor=#E9E9E9
| 280120 ||  || — || May 5, 2002 || Prescott || P. G. Comba || — || align=right | 3.7 km || 
|-id=121 bgcolor=#E9E9E9
| 280121 ||  || — || May 7, 2002 || Prescott || P. G. Comba || ADE || align=right | 2.6 km || 
|-id=122 bgcolor=#E9E9E9
| 280122 ||  || — || May 11, 2002 || Socorro || LINEAR || — || align=right | 2.8 km || 
|-id=123 bgcolor=#E9E9E9
| 280123 ||  || — || May 15, 2002 || Haleakala || NEAT || RAF || align=right | 1.0 km || 
|-id=124 bgcolor=#fefefe
| 280124 ||  || — || May 7, 2002 || Palomar || NEAT || — || align=right | 1.2 km || 
|-id=125 bgcolor=#fefefe
| 280125 ||  || — || May 9, 2002 || Palomar || NEAT || MAS || align=right data-sort-value="0.85" | 850 m || 
|-id=126 bgcolor=#E9E9E9
| 280126 ||  || — || May 1, 2002 || Palomar || NEAT || ADE || align=right | 3.2 km || 
|-id=127 bgcolor=#E9E9E9
| 280127 ||  || — || May 16, 2002 || Socorro || LINEAR || — || align=right | 2.8 km || 
|-id=128 bgcolor=#E9E9E9
| 280128 ||  || — || May 17, 2002 || Palomar || NEAT || EUN || align=right | 1.7 km || 
|-id=129 bgcolor=#d6d6d6
| 280129 ||  || — || June 8, 2002 || Socorro || LINEAR || TIR || align=right | 4.6 km || 
|-id=130 bgcolor=#fefefe
| 280130 ||  || — || June 7, 2002 || Haleakala || NEAT || — || align=right data-sort-value="0.98" | 980 m || 
|-id=131 bgcolor=#E9E9E9
| 280131 ||  || — || June 11, 2002 || Socorro || LINEAR || GER || align=right | 1.7 km || 
|-id=132 bgcolor=#E9E9E9
| 280132 ||  || — || July 13, 2002 || Socorro || LINEAR || — || align=right | 3.1 km || 
|-id=133 bgcolor=#fefefe
| 280133 ||  || — || July 14, 2002 || Palomar || NEAT || — || align=right data-sort-value="0.78" | 780 m || 
|-id=134 bgcolor=#E9E9E9
| 280134 ||  || — || July 8, 2002 || Palomar || NEAT || — || align=right | 3.2 km || 
|-id=135 bgcolor=#fefefe
| 280135 ||  || — || July 14, 2002 || Palomar || NEAT || — || align=right data-sort-value="0.78" | 780 m || 
|-id=136 bgcolor=#FFC2E0
| 280136 ||  || — || July 17, 2002 || Palomar || NEAT || APO +1km || align=right | 1.4 km || 
|-id=137 bgcolor=#E9E9E9
| 280137 ||  || — || July 21, 2002 || Palomar || NEAT || — || align=right | 3.8 km || 
|-id=138 bgcolor=#fefefe
| 280138 ||  || — || July 18, 2002 || Socorro || LINEAR || H || align=right data-sort-value="0.72" | 720 m || 
|-id=139 bgcolor=#E9E9E9
| 280139 ||  || — || August 5, 2002 || Palomar || NEAT || — || align=right | 4.1 km || 
|-id=140 bgcolor=#d6d6d6
| 280140 ||  || — || August 5, 2002 || Palomar || NEAT || — || align=right | 3.9 km || 
|-id=141 bgcolor=#d6d6d6
| 280141 ||  || — || August 6, 2002 || Palomar || NEAT || — || align=right | 3.7 km || 
|-id=142 bgcolor=#d6d6d6
| 280142 ||  || — || August 6, 2002 || Palomar || NEAT || CHA || align=right | 3.1 km || 
|-id=143 bgcolor=#E9E9E9
| 280143 ||  || — || August 6, 2002 || Palomar || NEAT || — || align=right | 2.8 km || 
|-id=144 bgcolor=#E9E9E9
| 280144 ||  || — || August 9, 2002 || Socorro || LINEAR || — || align=right | 2.8 km || 
|-id=145 bgcolor=#fefefe
| 280145 ||  || — || August 13, 2002 || Socorro || LINEAR || — || align=right | 1.1 km || 
|-id=146 bgcolor=#d6d6d6
| 280146 ||  || — || August 14, 2002 || Palomar || NEAT || BRA || align=right | 2.0 km || 
|-id=147 bgcolor=#fefefe
| 280147 ||  || — || August 14, 2002 || Socorro || LINEAR || — || align=right data-sort-value="0.85" | 850 m || 
|-id=148 bgcolor=#E9E9E9
| 280148 ||  || — || August 12, 2002 || Socorro || LINEAR || JUN || align=right | 1.3 km || 
|-id=149 bgcolor=#fefefe
| 280149 ||  || — || August 12, 2002 || Socorro || LINEAR || H || align=right data-sort-value="0.66" | 660 m || 
|-id=150 bgcolor=#d6d6d6
| 280150 ||  || — || August 13, 2002 || Anderson Mesa || LONEOS || — || align=right | 4.2 km || 
|-id=151 bgcolor=#d6d6d6
| 280151 ||  || — || August 14, 2002 || Palomar || NEAT || BRA || align=right | 2.0 km || 
|-id=152 bgcolor=#E9E9E9
| 280152 ||  || — || August 8, 2002 || Anderson Mesa || LONEOS || JUN || align=right | 1.4 km || 
|-id=153 bgcolor=#d6d6d6
| 280153 ||  || — || August 8, 2002 || Palomar || S. F. Hönig || — || align=right | 4.2 km || 
|-id=154 bgcolor=#fefefe
| 280154 ||  || — || August 8, 2002 || Palomar || S. F. Hönig || — || align=right data-sort-value="0.74" | 740 m || 
|-id=155 bgcolor=#E9E9E9
| 280155 ||  || — || August 8, 2002 || Palomar || A. Lowe || AST || align=right | 1.9 km || 
|-id=156 bgcolor=#E9E9E9
| 280156 ||  || — || August 7, 2002 || Palomar || NEAT || — || align=right | 3.0 km || 
|-id=157 bgcolor=#fefefe
| 280157 ||  || — || August 15, 2002 || Palomar || NEAT || FLO || align=right data-sort-value="0.79" | 790 m || 
|-id=158 bgcolor=#d6d6d6
| 280158 ||  || — || August 15, 2002 || Palomar || NEAT || K-2 || align=right | 1.4 km || 
|-id=159 bgcolor=#d6d6d6
| 280159 ||  || — || October 17, 2003 || Kitt Peak || Spacewatch || EOS || align=right | 2.2 km || 
|-id=160 bgcolor=#E9E9E9
| 280160 ||  || — || August 26, 2002 || Palomar || NEAT || — || align=right | 2.7 km || 
|-id=161 bgcolor=#E9E9E9
| 280161 ||  || — || August 29, 2002 || Palomar || NEAT || — || align=right | 2.5 km || 
|-id=162 bgcolor=#fefefe
| 280162 ||  || — || August 16, 2002 || Palomar || R. Matson || — || align=right data-sort-value="0.76" | 760 m || 
|-id=163 bgcolor=#E9E9E9
| 280163 ||  || — || August 29, 2002 || Palomar || NEAT || — || align=right | 2.5 km || 
|-id=164 bgcolor=#E9E9E9
| 280164 ||  || — || August 30, 2002 || Palomar || NEAT || — || align=right | 1.3 km || 
|-id=165 bgcolor=#fefefe
| 280165 ||  || — || August 19, 2002 || Palomar || NEAT || — || align=right data-sort-value="0.85" | 850 m || 
|-id=166 bgcolor=#d6d6d6
| 280166 ||  || — || August 19, 2002 || Palomar || NEAT || HYG || align=right | 3.5 km || 
|-id=167 bgcolor=#d6d6d6
| 280167 ||  || — || August 18, 2002 || Palomar || NEAT || VER || align=right | 3.8 km || 
|-id=168 bgcolor=#d6d6d6
| 280168 ||  || — || August 27, 2002 || Palomar || NEAT || — || align=right | 3.6 km || 
|-id=169 bgcolor=#d6d6d6
| 280169 ||  || — || August 27, 2002 || Palomar || NEAT || — || align=right | 2.9 km || 
|-id=170 bgcolor=#d6d6d6
| 280170 ||  || — || September 4, 2002 || Anderson Mesa || LONEOS || KOR || align=right | 2.2 km || 
|-id=171 bgcolor=#d6d6d6
| 280171 ||  || — || September 4, 2002 || Anderson Mesa || LONEOS || — || align=right | 2.9 km || 
|-id=172 bgcolor=#fefefe
| 280172 ||  || — || September 5, 2002 || Anderson Mesa || LONEOS || — || align=right data-sort-value="0.95" | 950 m || 
|-id=173 bgcolor=#E9E9E9
| 280173 ||  || — || September 5, 2002 || Anderson Mesa || LONEOS || — || align=right | 3.5 km || 
|-id=174 bgcolor=#fefefe
| 280174 ||  || — || September 6, 2002 || Socorro || LINEAR || — || align=right data-sort-value="0.93" | 930 m || 
|-id=175 bgcolor=#d6d6d6
| 280175 ||  || — || September 7, 2002 || Kleť || Kleť Obs. || — || align=right | 3.8 km || 
|-id=176 bgcolor=#d6d6d6
| 280176 ||  || — || September 9, 2002 || Palomar || NEAT || — || align=right | 4.4 km || 
|-id=177 bgcolor=#d6d6d6
| 280177 ||  || — || September 10, 2002 || Palomar || NEAT || — || align=right | 5.3 km || 
|-id=178 bgcolor=#E9E9E9
| 280178 ||  || — || September 10, 2002 || Palomar || NEAT || — || align=right | 2.8 km || 
|-id=179 bgcolor=#d6d6d6
| 280179 ||  || — || September 11, 2002 || Haleakala || NEAT || — || align=right | 4.3 km || 
|-id=180 bgcolor=#E9E9E9
| 280180 ||  || — || September 13, 2002 || Anderson Mesa || LONEOS || RAF || align=right | 1.4 km || 
|-id=181 bgcolor=#d6d6d6
| 280181 ||  || — || September 14, 2002 || Palomar || NEAT || LIX || align=right | 5.5 km || 
|-id=182 bgcolor=#d6d6d6
| 280182 ||  || — || September 11, 2002 || Palomar || NEAT || — || align=right | 3.6 km || 
|-id=183 bgcolor=#d6d6d6
| 280183 ||  || — || September 11, 2002 || Palomar || NEAT || EUP || align=right | 5.8 km || 
|-id=184 bgcolor=#E9E9E9
| 280184 ||  || — || September 12, 2002 || Palomar || NEAT || — || align=right | 3.1 km || 
|-id=185 bgcolor=#d6d6d6
| 280185 ||  || — || September 12, 2002 || Palomar || NEAT || — || align=right | 4.9 km || 
|-id=186 bgcolor=#d6d6d6
| 280186 ||  || — || September 13, 2002 || Palomar || NEAT || — || align=right | 4.4 km || 
|-id=187 bgcolor=#E9E9E9
| 280187 ||  || — || September 14, 2002 || Palomar || R. Matson || — || align=right | 2.3 km || 
|-id=188 bgcolor=#fefefe
| 280188 ||  || — || September 14, 2002 || Palomar || NEAT || — || align=right data-sort-value="0.85" | 850 m || 
|-id=189 bgcolor=#d6d6d6
| 280189 ||  || — || September 26, 2002 || Palomar || NEAT || — || align=right | 3.3 km || 
|-id=190 bgcolor=#fefefe
| 280190 ||  || — || September 26, 2002 || Palomar || NEAT || NYS || align=right | 2.1 km || 
|-id=191 bgcolor=#d6d6d6
| 280191 ||  || — || September 26, 2002 || Palomar || NEAT || — || align=right | 2.8 km || 
|-id=192 bgcolor=#d6d6d6
| 280192 ||  || — || September 29, 2002 || Haleakala || NEAT || — || align=right | 3.7 km || 
|-id=193 bgcolor=#fefefe
| 280193 ||  || — || September 30, 2002 || Socorro || LINEAR || — || align=right | 1.1 km || 
|-id=194 bgcolor=#E9E9E9
| 280194 ||  || — || September 18, 2002 || Palomar || NEAT || — || align=right | 4.3 km || 
|-id=195 bgcolor=#d6d6d6
| 280195 ||  || — || September 17, 2002 || Palomar || NEAT || — || align=right | 3.2 km || 
|-id=196 bgcolor=#d6d6d6
| 280196 ||  || — || September 17, 2002 || Haleakala || NEAT || EOS || align=right | 3.6 km || 
|-id=197 bgcolor=#d6d6d6
| 280197 ||  || — || October 2, 2002 || Socorro || LINEAR || — || align=right | 3.3 km || 
|-id=198 bgcolor=#fefefe
| 280198 ||  || — || October 2, 2002 || Socorro || LINEAR || — || align=right data-sort-value="0.95" | 950 m || 
|-id=199 bgcolor=#fefefe
| 280199 ||  || — || October 2, 2002 || Socorro || LINEAR || — || align=right data-sort-value="0.77" | 770 m || 
|-id=200 bgcolor=#fefefe
| 280200 ||  || — || October 2, 2002 || Socorro || LINEAR || — || align=right | 1.2 km || 
|}

280201–280300 

|-bgcolor=#E9E9E9
| 280201 ||  || — || October 4, 2002 || Socorro || LINEAR || — || align=right | 1.3 km || 
|-id=202 bgcolor=#d6d6d6
| 280202 ||  || — || October 4, 2002 || Palomar || NEAT || EOS || align=right | 2.8 km || 
|-id=203 bgcolor=#fefefe
| 280203 ||  || — || October 4, 2002 || Palomar || NEAT || V || align=right data-sort-value="0.71" | 710 m || 
|-id=204 bgcolor=#d6d6d6
| 280204 ||  || — || October 4, 2002 || Anderson Mesa || LONEOS || — || align=right | 3.8 km || 
|-id=205 bgcolor=#fefefe
| 280205 ||  || — || October 12, 2002 || Socorro || LINEAR || — || align=right data-sort-value="0.93" | 930 m || 
|-id=206 bgcolor=#d6d6d6
| 280206 ||  || — || October 4, 2002 || Socorro || LINEAR || TEL || align=right | 2.3 km || 
|-id=207 bgcolor=#E9E9E9
| 280207 ||  || — || October 4, 2002 || Socorro || LINEAR || POS || align=right | 3.9 km || 
|-id=208 bgcolor=#fefefe
| 280208 ||  || — || October 4, 2002 || Socorro || LINEAR || — || align=right | 1.0 km || 
|-id=209 bgcolor=#d6d6d6
| 280209 ||  || — || October 7, 2002 || Socorro || LINEAR || EOS || align=right | 2.7 km || 
|-id=210 bgcolor=#fefefe
| 280210 ||  || — || October 4, 2002 || Socorro || LINEAR || — || align=right | 1.0 km || 
|-id=211 bgcolor=#fefefe
| 280211 ||  || — || October 9, 2002 || Socorro || LINEAR || — || align=right | 1.2 km || 
|-id=212 bgcolor=#fefefe
| 280212 ||  || — || October 9, 2002 || Socorro || LINEAR || FLO || align=right | 1.00 km || 
|-id=213 bgcolor=#d6d6d6
| 280213 ||  || — || October 10, 2002 || Palomar || NEAT || — || align=right | 6.1 km || 
|-id=214 bgcolor=#d6d6d6
| 280214 ||  || — || October 10, 2002 || Socorro || LINEAR || — || align=right | 3.7 km || 
|-id=215 bgcolor=#fefefe
| 280215 ||  || — || October 10, 2002 || Socorro || LINEAR || — || align=right | 1.4 km || 
|-id=216 bgcolor=#d6d6d6
| 280216 ||  || — || October 8, 2002 || Anderson Mesa || LONEOS || — || align=right | 3.7 km || 
|-id=217 bgcolor=#fefefe
| 280217 ||  || — || October 4, 2002 || Apache Point || SDSS || — || align=right data-sort-value="0.88" | 880 m || 
|-id=218 bgcolor=#E9E9E9
| 280218 ||  || — || October 5, 2002 || Apache Point || SDSS || — || align=right | 1.6 km || 
|-id=219 bgcolor=#d6d6d6
| 280219 ||  || — || October 5, 2002 || Apache Point || SDSS || — || align=right | 3.7 km || 
|-id=220 bgcolor=#d6d6d6
| 280220 ||  || — || October 10, 2002 || Apache Point || SDSS || — || align=right | 2.7 km || 
|-id=221 bgcolor=#d6d6d6
| 280221 ||  || — || October 10, 2002 || Apache Point || SDSS || — || align=right | 3.3 km || 
|-id=222 bgcolor=#fefefe
| 280222 ||  || — || October 30, 2002 || Palomar || NEAT || — || align=right data-sort-value="0.96" | 960 m || 
|-id=223 bgcolor=#fefefe
| 280223 ||  || — || October 31, 2002 || Socorro || LINEAR || FLO || align=right data-sort-value="0.77" | 770 m || 
|-id=224 bgcolor=#d6d6d6
| 280224 ||  || — || October 29, 2002 || Apache Point || SDSS || — || align=right | 3.9 km || 
|-id=225 bgcolor=#d6d6d6
| 280225 ||  || — || October 29, 2002 || Apache Point || SDSS || — || align=right | 3.9 km || 
|-id=226 bgcolor=#d6d6d6
| 280226 ||  || — || October 30, 2002 || Apache Point || SDSS || TEL || align=right | 1.6 km || 
|-id=227 bgcolor=#fefefe
| 280227 ||  || — || October 30, 2002 || Apache Point || SDSS || — || align=right data-sort-value="0.86" | 860 m || 
|-id=228 bgcolor=#fefefe
| 280228 ||  || — || October 31, 2002 || Palomar || NEAT || FLO || align=right data-sort-value="0.74" | 740 m || 
|-id=229 bgcolor=#d6d6d6
| 280229 ||  || — || October 31, 2002 || Palomar || NEAT || — || align=right | 3.7 km || 
|-id=230 bgcolor=#d6d6d6
| 280230 ||  || — || November 1, 2002 || Palomar || NEAT || — || align=right | 4.4 km || 
|-id=231 bgcolor=#fefefe
| 280231 ||  || — || November 4, 2002 || Palomar || NEAT || — || align=right data-sort-value="0.93" | 930 m || 
|-id=232 bgcolor=#fefefe
| 280232 ||  || — || November 5, 2002 || Socorro || LINEAR || — || align=right | 1.2 km || 
|-id=233 bgcolor=#fefefe
| 280233 ||  || — || November 5, 2002 || Socorro || LINEAR || — || align=right data-sort-value="0.90" | 900 m || 
|-id=234 bgcolor=#d6d6d6
| 280234 ||  || — || November 5, 2002 || Socorro || LINEAR || — || align=right | 5.3 km || 
|-id=235 bgcolor=#d6d6d6
| 280235 ||  || — || November 5, 2002 || Socorro || LINEAR || ALA || align=right | 4.6 km || 
|-id=236 bgcolor=#fefefe
| 280236 ||  || — || November 5, 2002 || Socorro || LINEAR || FLO || align=right data-sort-value="0.98" | 980 m || 
|-id=237 bgcolor=#d6d6d6
| 280237 ||  || — || November 5, 2002 || Socorro || LINEAR || — || align=right | 3.8 km || 
|-id=238 bgcolor=#fefefe
| 280238 ||  || — || November 7, 2002 || Socorro || LINEAR || FLO || align=right data-sort-value="0.74" | 740 m || 
|-id=239 bgcolor=#d6d6d6
| 280239 ||  || — || November 7, 2002 || Socorro || LINEAR || — || align=right | 4.4 km || 
|-id=240 bgcolor=#d6d6d6
| 280240 ||  || — || November 13, 2002 || Kitt Peak || Spacewatch || — || align=right | 4.6 km || 
|-id=241 bgcolor=#d6d6d6
| 280241 ||  || — || November 6, 2002 || Haleakala || NEAT || THM || align=right | 3.3 km || 
|-id=242 bgcolor=#d6d6d6
| 280242 ||  || — || November 5, 2002 || Palomar || NEAT || — || align=right | 5.0 km || 
|-id=243 bgcolor=#d6d6d6
| 280243 ||  || — || November 4, 2002 || Palomar || NEAT || — || align=right | 2.7 km || 
|-id=244 bgcolor=#FFC2E0
| 280244 ||  || — || November 27, 2002 || Campo Imperatore || CINEOS || AMO +1km || align=right data-sort-value="0.86" | 860 m || 
|-id=245 bgcolor=#d6d6d6
| 280245 ||  || — || November 16, 2002 || Palomar || NEAT || — || align=right | 3.0 km || 
|-id=246 bgcolor=#fefefe
| 280246 ||  || — || November 22, 2002 || Palomar || NEAT || — || align=right data-sort-value="0.89" | 890 m || 
|-id=247 bgcolor=#d6d6d6
| 280247 ||  || — || November 16, 2002 || Palomar || NEAT || — || align=right | 3.9 km || 
|-id=248 bgcolor=#d6d6d6
| 280248 ||  || — || November 22, 2002 || Palomar || NEAT || — || align=right | 4.1 km || 
|-id=249 bgcolor=#d6d6d6
| 280249 ||  || — || December 1, 2002 || Socorro || LINEAR || — || align=right | 4.2 km || 
|-id=250 bgcolor=#d6d6d6
| 280250 ||  || — || December 3, 2002 || Palomar || NEAT || — || align=right | 4.7 km || 
|-id=251 bgcolor=#fefefe
| 280251 ||  || — || December 3, 2002 || Palomar || NEAT || V || align=right data-sort-value="0.89" | 890 m || 
|-id=252 bgcolor=#FA8072
| 280252 ||  || — || December 5, 2002 || Socorro || LINEAR || — || align=right | 1.1 km || 
|-id=253 bgcolor=#d6d6d6
| 280253 ||  || — || December 7, 2002 || Socorro || LINEAR || — || align=right | 3.5 km || 
|-id=254 bgcolor=#d6d6d6
| 280254 ||  || — || December 10, 2002 || Socorro || LINEAR || — || align=right | 5.2 km || 
|-id=255 bgcolor=#d6d6d6
| 280255 ||  || — || December 10, 2002 || Palomar || NEAT || — || align=right | 4.1 km || 
|-id=256 bgcolor=#fefefe
| 280256 ||  || — || December 10, 2002 || Palomar || NEAT || V || align=right data-sort-value="0.89" | 890 m || 
|-id=257 bgcolor=#fefefe
| 280257 ||  || — || December 11, 2002 || Socorro || LINEAR || — || align=right | 1.3 km || 
|-id=258 bgcolor=#fefefe
| 280258 ||  || — || December 11, 2002 || Socorro || LINEAR || — || align=right | 1.4 km || 
|-id=259 bgcolor=#d6d6d6
| 280259 ||  || — || December 3, 2002 || Palomar || S. F. Hönig || EOS || align=right | 2.9 km || 
|-id=260 bgcolor=#d6d6d6
| 280260 ||  || — || December 5, 2002 || Socorro || LINEAR || HYG || align=right | 3.8 km || 
|-id=261 bgcolor=#d6d6d6
| 280261 ||  || — || December 5, 2002 || Socorro || LINEAR || — || align=right | 5.4 km || 
|-id=262 bgcolor=#fefefe
| 280262 ||  || — || December 5, 2002 || Socorro || LINEAR || — || align=right data-sort-value="0.92" | 920 m || 
|-id=263 bgcolor=#fefefe
| 280263 ||  || — || December 7, 2002 || Kitt Peak || M. W. Buie || V || align=right data-sort-value="0.99" | 990 m || 
|-id=264 bgcolor=#d6d6d6
| 280264 ||  || — || December 13, 2002 || Palomar || NEAT || — || align=right | 3.2 km || 
|-id=265 bgcolor=#d6d6d6
| 280265 ||  || — || December 3, 2002 || Palomar || NEAT || — || align=right | 4.1 km || 
|-id=266 bgcolor=#d6d6d6
| 280266 ||  || — || December 28, 2002 || Nashville || R. Clingan || EOS || align=right | 2.6 km || 
|-id=267 bgcolor=#fefefe
| 280267 ||  || — || January 4, 2003 || Socorro || LINEAR || PHO || align=right | 1.3 km || 
|-id=268 bgcolor=#fefefe
| 280268 ||  || — || January 4, 2003 || Socorro || LINEAR || V || align=right | 1.0 km || 
|-id=269 bgcolor=#fefefe
| 280269 ||  || — || January 7, 2003 || Socorro || LINEAR || — || align=right | 1.0 km || 
|-id=270 bgcolor=#fefefe
| 280270 ||  || — || January 7, 2003 || Socorro || LINEAR || FLO || align=right data-sort-value="0.92" | 920 m || 
|-id=271 bgcolor=#d6d6d6
| 280271 ||  || — || January 6, 2003 || Kitt Peak || Spacewatch || — || align=right | 2.9 km || 
|-id=272 bgcolor=#E9E9E9
| 280272 ||  || — || January 26, 2003 || Anderson Mesa || LONEOS || HNS || align=right | 1.7 km || 
|-id=273 bgcolor=#fefefe
| 280273 ||  || — || January 26, 2003 || Haleakala || NEAT || V || align=right data-sort-value="0.94" | 940 m || 
|-id=274 bgcolor=#fefefe
| 280274 ||  || — || January 30, 2003 || Socorro || LINEAR || FLO || align=right data-sort-value="0.98" | 980 m || 
|-id=275 bgcolor=#E9E9E9
| 280275 ||  || — || February 1, 2003 || Anderson Mesa || LONEOS || — || align=right | 1.5 km || 
|-id=276 bgcolor=#E9E9E9
| 280276 ||  || — || February 1, 2003 || Socorro || LINEAR || — || align=right | 1.4 km || 
|-id=277 bgcolor=#E9E9E9
| 280277 ||  || — || February 1, 2003 || Socorro || LINEAR || — || align=right | 1.7 km || 
|-id=278 bgcolor=#E9E9E9
| 280278 ||  || — || February 21, 2003 || Palomar || NEAT || — || align=right | 1.1 km || 
|-id=279 bgcolor=#E9E9E9
| 280279 ||  || — || March 6, 2003 || Anderson Mesa || LONEOS || — || align=right | 1.1 km || 
|-id=280 bgcolor=#fefefe
| 280280 ||  || — || March 6, 2003 || Socorro || LINEAR || — || align=right | 1.5 km || 
|-id=281 bgcolor=#fefefe
| 280281 ||  || — || March 22, 2003 || Ondřejov || L. Kotková || — || align=right | 2.2 km || 
|-id=282 bgcolor=#fefefe
| 280282 ||  || — || March 24, 2003 || Socorro || LINEAR || H || align=right data-sort-value="0.99" | 990 m || 
|-id=283 bgcolor=#E9E9E9
| 280283 ||  || — || March 24, 2003 || Kitt Peak || Spacewatch || GER || align=right | 1.7 km || 
|-id=284 bgcolor=#fefefe
| 280284 ||  || — || March 27, 2003 || Palomar || NEAT || V || align=right data-sort-value="0.85" | 850 m || 
|-id=285 bgcolor=#fefefe
| 280285 ||  || — || March 30, 2003 || Socorro || LINEAR || — || align=right | 1.6 km || 
|-id=286 bgcolor=#E9E9E9
| 280286 ||  || — || April 2, 2003 || Haleakala || NEAT || — || align=right | 1.4 km || 
|-id=287 bgcolor=#fefefe
| 280287 ||  || — || April 7, 2003 || Socorro || LINEAR || H || align=right data-sort-value="0.72" | 720 m || 
|-id=288 bgcolor=#E9E9E9
| 280288 ||  || — || April 26, 2003 || Haleakala || NEAT || — || align=right | 2.3 km || 
|-id=289 bgcolor=#fefefe
| 280289 ||  || — || April 29, 2003 || Kitt Peak || Spacewatch || NYS || align=right data-sort-value="0.84" | 840 m || 
|-id=290 bgcolor=#fefefe
| 280290 ||  || — || April 29, 2003 || Anderson Mesa || LONEOS || — || align=right | 1.0 km || 
|-id=291 bgcolor=#fefefe
| 280291 ||  || — || April 29, 2003 || Kitt Peak || Spacewatch || CIM || align=right | 3.3 km || 
|-id=292 bgcolor=#E9E9E9
| 280292 ||  || — || June 29, 2003 || Socorro || LINEAR || — || align=right | 2.7 km || 
|-id=293 bgcolor=#fefefe
| 280293 ||  || — || June 21, 2003 || Socorro || LINEAR || H || align=right data-sort-value="0.79" | 790 m || 
|-id=294 bgcolor=#E9E9E9
| 280294 ||  || — || July 3, 2003 || Kitt Peak || Spacewatch || — || align=right | 1.2 km || 
|-id=295 bgcolor=#E9E9E9
| 280295 ||  || — || July 26, 2003 || Reedy Creek || J. Broughton || — || align=right | 2.3 km || 
|-id=296 bgcolor=#E9E9E9
| 280296 ||  || — || July 25, 2003 || Socorro || LINEAR || — || align=right | 1.4 km || 
|-id=297 bgcolor=#fefefe
| 280297 ||  || — || July 24, 2003 || Palomar || NEAT || — || align=right data-sort-value="0.93" | 930 m || 
|-id=298 bgcolor=#E9E9E9
| 280298 ||  || — || July 24, 2003 || Palomar || NEAT || — || align=right | 1.4 km || 
|-id=299 bgcolor=#E9E9E9
| 280299 ||  || — || August 1, 2003 || Socorro || LINEAR || JUN || align=right | 1.5 km || 
|-id=300 bgcolor=#E9E9E9
| 280300 ||  || — || August 20, 2003 || Palomar || NEAT || — || align=right | 2.4 km || 
|}

280301–280400 

|-bgcolor=#E9E9E9
| 280301 ||  || — || August 20, 2003 || Campo Imperatore || CINEOS || — || align=right | 2.0 km || 
|-id=302 bgcolor=#E9E9E9
| 280302 ||  || — || August 22, 2003 || Palomar || NEAT || EUN || align=right | 1.6 km || 
|-id=303 bgcolor=#E9E9E9
| 280303 ||  || — || August 24, 2003 || Reedy Creek || J. Broughton || — || align=right | 1.5 km || 
|-id=304 bgcolor=#E9E9E9
| 280304 ||  || — || August 22, 2003 || Palomar || NEAT || — || align=right | 1.8 km || 
|-id=305 bgcolor=#E9E9E9
| 280305 ||  || — || August 21, 2003 || Palomar || NEAT || EUN || align=right | 1.8 km || 
|-id=306 bgcolor=#E9E9E9
| 280306 ||  || — || August 22, 2003 || Socorro || LINEAR || — || align=right | 1.6 km || 
|-id=307 bgcolor=#E9E9E9
| 280307 ||  || — || August 22, 2003 || Palomar || NEAT || ADE || align=right | 2.6 km || 
|-id=308 bgcolor=#E9E9E9
| 280308 ||  || — || August 23, 2003 || Palomar || NEAT || NEM || align=right | 3.1 km || 
|-id=309 bgcolor=#fefefe
| 280309 ||  || — || August 22, 2003 || Socorro || LINEAR || H || align=right | 1.2 km || 
|-id=310 bgcolor=#E9E9E9
| 280310 ||  || — || August 27, 2003 || Palomar || NEAT || — || align=right | 2.7 km || 
|-id=311 bgcolor=#E9E9E9
| 280311 ||  || — || August 24, 2003 || Socorro || LINEAR || — || align=right | 2.1 km || 
|-id=312 bgcolor=#d6d6d6
| 280312 ||  || — || August 25, 2003 || Socorro || LINEAR || — || align=right | 4.2 km || 
|-id=313 bgcolor=#E9E9E9
| 280313 ||  || — || August 26, 2003 || Cerro Tololo || M. W. Buie || — || align=right | 2.3 km || 
|-id=314 bgcolor=#E9E9E9
| 280314 ||  || — || August 29, 2003 || Haleakala || NEAT || — || align=right | 2.7 km || 
|-id=315 bgcolor=#fefefe
| 280315 ||  || — || August 31, 2003 || Kitt Peak || Spacewatch || NYS || align=right data-sort-value="0.80" | 800 m || 
|-id=316 bgcolor=#E9E9E9
| 280316 ||  || — || August 26, 2003 || Cerro Tololo || M. W. Buie || — || align=right | 2.2 km || 
|-id=317 bgcolor=#E9E9E9
| 280317 ||  || — || September 2, 2003 || Socorro || LINEAR || — || align=right | 2.4 km || 
|-id=318 bgcolor=#fefefe
| 280318 ||  || — || September 15, 2003 || Anderson Mesa || LONEOS || V || align=right data-sort-value="0.89" | 890 m || 
|-id=319 bgcolor=#E9E9E9
| 280319 ||  || — || September 15, 2003 || Anderson Mesa || LONEOS || AEO || align=right | 1.8 km || 
|-id=320 bgcolor=#E9E9E9
| 280320 ||  || — || September 15, 2003 || Anderson Mesa || LONEOS || — || align=right | 1.9 km || 
|-id=321 bgcolor=#E9E9E9
| 280321 ||  || — || September 15, 2003 || Anderson Mesa || LONEOS || — || align=right | 3.7 km || 
|-id=322 bgcolor=#E9E9E9
| 280322 ||  || — || September 15, 2003 || Palomar || NEAT || — || align=right | 1.6 km || 
|-id=323 bgcolor=#E9E9E9
| 280323 ||  || — || September 15, 2003 || Palomar || NEAT || — || align=right | 2.7 km || 
|-id=324 bgcolor=#E9E9E9
| 280324 ||  || — || September 17, 2003 || Desert Eagle || W. K. Y. Yeung || — || align=right | 2.4 km || 
|-id=325 bgcolor=#E9E9E9
| 280325 ||  || — || September 16, 2003 || Kitt Peak || Spacewatch || — || align=right | 1.7 km || 
|-id=326 bgcolor=#E9E9E9
| 280326 ||  || — || September 18, 2003 || Kitt Peak || Spacewatch || — || align=right | 2.8 km || 
|-id=327 bgcolor=#E9E9E9
| 280327 ||  || — || September 18, 2003 || Kitt Peak || Spacewatch || AGN || align=right | 1.2 km || 
|-id=328 bgcolor=#E9E9E9
| 280328 ||  || — || September 17, 2003 || Anderson Mesa || LONEOS || — || align=right | 2.2 km || 
|-id=329 bgcolor=#E9E9E9
| 280329 ||  || — || September 19, 2003 || Socorro || LINEAR || GEF || align=right | 1.8 km || 
|-id=330 bgcolor=#E9E9E9
| 280330 ||  || — || September 17, 2003 || Kitt Peak || Spacewatch || AEO || align=right | 1.5 km || 
|-id=331 bgcolor=#E9E9E9
| 280331 ||  || — || September 19, 2003 || Kitt Peak || Spacewatch || — || align=right | 3.0 km || 
|-id=332 bgcolor=#E9E9E9
| 280332 ||  || — || September 19, 2003 || Kitt Peak || Spacewatch || — || align=right | 3.6 km || 
|-id=333 bgcolor=#E9E9E9
| 280333 ||  || — || September 19, 2003 || Haleakala || NEAT || — || align=right | 3.2 km || 
|-id=334 bgcolor=#E9E9E9
| 280334 ||  || — || September 19, 2003 || Haleakala || NEAT || — || align=right | 2.4 km || 
|-id=335 bgcolor=#d6d6d6
| 280335 ||  || — || September 20, 2003 || Palomar || NEAT || 615 || align=right | 2.2 km || 
|-id=336 bgcolor=#E9E9E9
| 280336 ||  || — || September 21, 2003 || Desert Eagle || W. K. Y. Yeung || — || align=right | 3.3 km || 
|-id=337 bgcolor=#d6d6d6
| 280337 ||  || — || September 19, 2003 || Campo Imperatore || CINEOS || — || align=right | 4.0 km || 
|-id=338 bgcolor=#E9E9E9
| 280338 ||  || — || September 19, 2003 || Palomar || NEAT || — || align=right | 3.9 km || 
|-id=339 bgcolor=#E9E9E9
| 280339 ||  || — || September 19, 2003 || Anderson Mesa || LONEOS || NEM || align=right | 2.8 km || 
|-id=340 bgcolor=#E9E9E9
| 280340 ||  || — || September 19, 2003 || Campo Imperatore || CINEOS || AGN || align=right | 1.9 km || 
|-id=341 bgcolor=#d6d6d6
| 280341 ||  || — || September 23, 2003 || Haleakala || NEAT || — || align=right | 4.4 km || 
|-id=342 bgcolor=#E9E9E9
| 280342 ||  || — || September 18, 2003 || Socorro || LINEAR || WIT || align=right | 1.3 km || 
|-id=343 bgcolor=#E9E9E9
| 280343 ||  || — || September 18, 2003 || Palomar || NEAT || MAR || align=right | 4.1 km || 
|-id=344 bgcolor=#E9E9E9
| 280344 ||  || — || September 21, 2003 || Anderson Mesa || LONEOS || AGN || align=right | 1.7 km || 
|-id=345 bgcolor=#E9E9E9
| 280345 ||  || — || September 26, 2003 || Socorro || LINEAR || — || align=right | 2.8 km || 
|-id=346 bgcolor=#E9E9E9
| 280346 ||  || — || September 24, 2003 || Bergisch Gladbach || W. Bickel || — || align=right | 2.0 km || 
|-id=347 bgcolor=#E9E9E9
| 280347 ||  || — || September 27, 2003 || Socorro || LINEAR || — || align=right | 2.9 km || 
|-id=348 bgcolor=#E9E9E9
| 280348 ||  || — || September 24, 2003 || Palomar || NEAT || NEM || align=right | 3.0 km || 
|-id=349 bgcolor=#d6d6d6
| 280349 ||  || — || September 27, 2003 || Kitt Peak || Spacewatch || — || align=right | 3.0 km || 
|-id=350 bgcolor=#E9E9E9
| 280350 ||  || — || September 28, 2003 || Kitt Peak || Spacewatch || GEF || align=right | 1.9 km || 
|-id=351 bgcolor=#E9E9E9
| 280351 ||  || — || September 22, 2003 || Anderson Mesa || LONEOS || NEM || align=right | 2.4 km || 
|-id=352 bgcolor=#d6d6d6
| 280352 ||  || — || September 18, 2003 || Palomar || NEAT || — || align=right | 3.1 km || 
|-id=353 bgcolor=#E9E9E9
| 280353 ||  || — || September 19, 2003 || Kitt Peak || Spacewatch || — || align=right | 2.8 km || 
|-id=354 bgcolor=#E9E9E9
| 280354 ||  || — || September 29, 2003 || Anderson Mesa || LONEOS || — || align=right | 4.2 km || 
|-id=355 bgcolor=#E9E9E9
| 280355 ||  || — || September 18, 2003 || Haleakala || NEAT || — || align=right | 3.3 km || 
|-id=356 bgcolor=#d6d6d6
| 280356 ||  || — || September 17, 2003 || Palomar || NEAT || — || align=right | 4.1 km || 
|-id=357 bgcolor=#E9E9E9
| 280357 ||  || — || September 17, 2003 || Palomar || NEAT || — || align=right | 2.3 km || 
|-id=358 bgcolor=#E9E9E9
| 280358 ||  || — || September 17, 2003 || Kitt Peak || Spacewatch || — || align=right | 2.2 km || 
|-id=359 bgcolor=#E9E9E9
| 280359 ||  || — || September 17, 2003 || Palomar || NEAT || — || align=right | 1.8 km || 
|-id=360 bgcolor=#E9E9E9
| 280360 ||  || — || September 26, 2003 || Apache Point || SDSS || — || align=right | 1.9 km || 
|-id=361 bgcolor=#E9E9E9
| 280361 ||  || — || September 28, 2003 || Anderson Mesa || LONEOS || NEM || align=right | 3.1 km || 
|-id=362 bgcolor=#E9E9E9
| 280362 ||  || — || September 26, 2003 || Apache Point || SDSS || AGN || align=right | 1.4 km || 
|-id=363 bgcolor=#E9E9E9
| 280363 ||  || — || September 26, 2003 || Apache Point || SDSS || HOF || align=right | 3.2 km || 
|-id=364 bgcolor=#d6d6d6
| 280364 ||  || — || September 29, 2003 || Kitt Peak || Spacewatch || — || align=right | 4.0 km || 
|-id=365 bgcolor=#E9E9E9
| 280365 ||  || — || September 22, 2003 || Kitt Peak || Spacewatch || — || align=right | 3.4 km || 
|-id=366 bgcolor=#FA8072
| 280366 ||  || — || October 1, 2003 || Anderson Mesa || LONEOS || — || align=right | 2.7 km || 
|-id=367 bgcolor=#E9E9E9
| 280367 ||  || — || October 14, 2003 || Anderson Mesa || LONEOS || WIT || align=right | 1.7 km || 
|-id=368 bgcolor=#d6d6d6
| 280368 ||  || — || October 15, 2003 || Anderson Mesa || LONEOS || — || align=right | 3.2 km || 
|-id=369 bgcolor=#E9E9E9
| 280369 ||  || — || October 3, 2003 || Kitt Peak || Spacewatch || — || align=right | 3.3 km || 
|-id=370 bgcolor=#E9E9E9
| 280370 ||  || — || October 5, 2003 || Kitt Peak || Spacewatch || — || align=right | 2.8 km || 
|-id=371 bgcolor=#E9E9E9
| 280371 ||  || — || October 18, 2003 || Kleť || Kleť Obs. || — || align=right | 3.1 km || 
|-id=372 bgcolor=#E9E9E9
| 280372 ||  || — || October 16, 2003 || Palomar || NEAT || JUN || align=right | 1.9 km || 
|-id=373 bgcolor=#d6d6d6
| 280373 ||  || — || October 19, 2003 || Kitt Peak || Spacewatch || — || align=right | 4.2 km || 
|-id=374 bgcolor=#d6d6d6
| 280374 ||  || — || October 25, 2003 || Goodricke-Pigott || R. A. Tucker || — || align=right | 4.1 km || 
|-id=375 bgcolor=#E9E9E9
| 280375 ||  || — || October 23, 2003 || Goodricke-Pigott || R. A. Tucker || — || align=right | 2.8 km || 
|-id=376 bgcolor=#E9E9E9
| 280376 ||  || — || October 18, 2003 || Kitt Peak || Spacewatch || — || align=right | 3.1 km || 
|-id=377 bgcolor=#E9E9E9
| 280377 ||  || — || October 16, 2003 || Anderson Mesa || LONEOS || — || align=right | 3.7 km || 
|-id=378 bgcolor=#E9E9E9
| 280378 ||  || — || October 17, 2003 || Anderson Mesa || LONEOS || — || align=right | 2.1 km || 
|-id=379 bgcolor=#E9E9E9
| 280379 ||  || — || October 19, 2003 || Anderson Mesa || LONEOS || — || align=right | 1.9 km || 
|-id=380 bgcolor=#E9E9E9
| 280380 ||  || — || October 17, 2003 || Goodricke-Pigott || R. A. Tucker || AGN || align=right | 1.8 km || 
|-id=381 bgcolor=#E9E9E9
| 280381 ||  || — || October 20, 2003 || Socorro || LINEAR || WIT || align=right | 1.5 km || 
|-id=382 bgcolor=#fefefe
| 280382 ||  || — || October 19, 2003 || Kitt Peak || Spacewatch || PHO || align=right | 1.3 km || 
|-id=383 bgcolor=#E9E9E9
| 280383 ||  || — || October 18, 2003 || Palomar || NEAT || — || align=right | 3.9 km || 
|-id=384 bgcolor=#E9E9E9
| 280384 ||  || — || October 18, 2003 || Kitt Peak || Spacewatch || AGN || align=right | 1.7 km || 
|-id=385 bgcolor=#E9E9E9
| 280385 ||  || — || October 18, 2003 || Kitt Peak || Spacewatch || AGN || align=right | 1.3 km || 
|-id=386 bgcolor=#E9E9E9
| 280386 ||  || — || October 18, 2003 || Anderson Mesa || LONEOS || GEF || align=right | 2.2 km || 
|-id=387 bgcolor=#E9E9E9
| 280387 ||  || — || October 21, 2003 || Anderson Mesa || LONEOS || — || align=right | 3.2 km || 
|-id=388 bgcolor=#E9E9E9
| 280388 ||  || — || October 21, 2003 || Palomar || NEAT || MIS || align=right | 2.9 km || 
|-id=389 bgcolor=#E9E9E9
| 280389 ||  || — || October 21, 2003 || Palomar || NEAT || AGN || align=right | 1.5 km || 
|-id=390 bgcolor=#E9E9E9
| 280390 ||  || — || October 21, 2003 || Kitt Peak || Spacewatch || NEM || align=right | 2.7 km || 
|-id=391 bgcolor=#fefefe
| 280391 ||  || — || October 21, 2003 || Palomar || NEAT || MAS || align=right data-sort-value="0.85" | 850 m || 
|-id=392 bgcolor=#E9E9E9
| 280392 ||  || — || October 24, 2003 || Socorro || LINEAR || ADE || align=right | 3.0 km || 
|-id=393 bgcolor=#E9E9E9
| 280393 ||  || — || October 25, 2003 || Socorro || LINEAR || — || align=right | 3.2 km || 
|-id=394 bgcolor=#E9E9E9
| 280394 ||  || — || October 28, 2003 || Kitt Peak || Spacewatch || — || align=right | 2.3 km || 
|-id=395 bgcolor=#E9E9E9
| 280395 ||  || — || October 29, 2003 || Kitt Peak || Spacewatch || — || align=right | 4.3 km || 
|-id=396 bgcolor=#E9E9E9
| 280396 ||  || — || October 16, 2003 || Kitt Peak || Spacewatch || AGN || align=right | 1.3 km || 
|-id=397 bgcolor=#E9E9E9
| 280397 ||  || — || October 16, 2003 || Palomar || NEAT || — || align=right | 1.8 km || 
|-id=398 bgcolor=#E9E9E9
| 280398 ||  || — || October 19, 2003 || Apache Point || SDSS || AST || align=right | 1.9 km || 
|-id=399 bgcolor=#fefefe
| 280399 ||  || — || October 17, 2003 || Apache Point || SDSS || H || align=right data-sort-value="0.63" | 630 m || 
|-id=400 bgcolor=#E9E9E9
| 280400 ||  || — || October 17, 2003 || Apache Point || SDSS || — || align=right | 2.6 km || 
|}

280401–280500 

|-bgcolor=#E9E9E9
| 280401 ||  || — || October 19, 2003 || Apache Point || SDSS || HEN || align=right | 1.1 km || 
|-id=402 bgcolor=#E9E9E9
| 280402 ||  || — || October 19, 2003 || Apache Point || SDSS || — || align=right | 2.5 km || 
|-id=403 bgcolor=#d6d6d6
| 280403 ||  || — || October 22, 2003 || Apache Point || SDSS || — || align=right | 2.6 km || 
|-id=404 bgcolor=#d6d6d6
| 280404 ||  || — || November 15, 2003 || Kitt Peak || Spacewatch || KOR || align=right | 2.2 km || 
|-id=405 bgcolor=#E9E9E9
| 280405 ||  || — || November 16, 2003 || Kitt Peak || Spacewatch || AGN || align=right | 1.7 km || 
|-id=406 bgcolor=#E9E9E9
| 280406 ||  || — || November 18, 2003 || Kitt Peak || Spacewatch || — || align=right | 4.0 km || 
|-id=407 bgcolor=#d6d6d6
| 280407 ||  || — || November 20, 2003 || Socorro || LINEAR || — || align=right | 3.1 km || 
|-id=408 bgcolor=#d6d6d6
| 280408 ||  || — || November 18, 2003 || Kitt Peak || Spacewatch || — || align=right | 2.7 km || 
|-id=409 bgcolor=#d6d6d6
| 280409 ||  || — || November 20, 2003 || Socorro || LINEAR || — || align=right | 4.4 km || 
|-id=410 bgcolor=#fefefe
| 280410 ||  || — || November 21, 2003 || Socorro || LINEAR || — || align=right data-sort-value="0.95" | 950 m || 
|-id=411 bgcolor=#E9E9E9
| 280411 ||  || — || November 19, 2003 || Anderson Mesa || LONEOS || — || align=right | 2.4 km || 
|-id=412 bgcolor=#d6d6d6
| 280412 ||  || — || November 19, 2003 || Kitt Peak || Spacewatch || — || align=right | 3.5 km || 
|-id=413 bgcolor=#E9E9E9
| 280413 ||  || — || November 21, 2003 || Socorro || LINEAR || — || align=right | 3.8 km || 
|-id=414 bgcolor=#d6d6d6
| 280414 ||  || — || November 21, 2003 || Socorro || LINEAR || — || align=right | 3.9 km || 
|-id=415 bgcolor=#d6d6d6
| 280415 ||  || — || November 29, 2003 || Kitt Peak || Spacewatch || 7:4 || align=right | 6.0 km || 
|-id=416 bgcolor=#d6d6d6
| 280416 ||  || — || November 19, 2003 || Socorro || LINEAR || THB || align=right | 4.2 km || 
|-id=417 bgcolor=#d6d6d6
| 280417 ||  || — || December 1, 2003 || Socorro || LINEAR || EUP || align=right | 6.3 km || 
|-id=418 bgcolor=#d6d6d6
| 280418 ||  || — || December 4, 2003 || Socorro || LINEAR || — || align=right | 4.7 km || 
|-id=419 bgcolor=#E9E9E9
| 280419 ||  || — || December 1, 2003 || Kitt Peak || Spacewatch || — || align=right | 3.0 km || 
|-id=420 bgcolor=#d6d6d6
| 280420 ||  || — || December 19, 2003 || Socorro || LINEAR || — || align=right | 3.9 km || 
|-id=421 bgcolor=#E9E9E9
| 280421 ||  || — || December 17, 2003 || Kitt Peak || Spacewatch || — || align=right | 2.4 km || 
|-id=422 bgcolor=#d6d6d6
| 280422 ||  || — || December 17, 2003 || Kitt Peak || Spacewatch || EOS || align=right | 2.8 km || 
|-id=423 bgcolor=#d6d6d6
| 280423 ||  || — || December 17, 2003 || Kitt Peak || Spacewatch || HYG || align=right | 5.1 km || 
|-id=424 bgcolor=#d6d6d6
| 280424 ||  || — || December 19, 2003 || Socorro || LINEAR || — || align=right | 4.2 km || 
|-id=425 bgcolor=#E9E9E9
| 280425 ||  || — || December 19, 2003 || Kitt Peak || Spacewatch || — || align=right | 1.9 km || 
|-id=426 bgcolor=#d6d6d6
| 280426 ||  || — || December 19, 2003 || Socorro || LINEAR || — || align=right | 3.0 km || 
|-id=427 bgcolor=#d6d6d6
| 280427 ||  || — || December 19, 2003 || Socorro || LINEAR || — || align=right | 4.2 km || 
|-id=428 bgcolor=#d6d6d6
| 280428 ||  || — || December 19, 2003 || Kitt Peak || Spacewatch || — || align=right | 4.1 km || 
|-id=429 bgcolor=#d6d6d6
| 280429 ||  || — || December 19, 2003 || Kitt Peak || Spacewatch || THB || align=right | 5.6 km || 
|-id=430 bgcolor=#fefefe
| 280430 ||  || — || December 21, 2003 || Kitt Peak || Spacewatch || NYS || align=right data-sort-value="0.86" | 860 m || 
|-id=431 bgcolor=#d6d6d6
| 280431 ||  || — || December 21, 2003 || Kitt Peak || Spacewatch || — || align=right | 3.1 km || 
|-id=432 bgcolor=#E9E9E9
| 280432 ||  || — || December 22, 2003 || Socorro || LINEAR || JNS || align=right | 4.0 km || 
|-id=433 bgcolor=#d6d6d6
| 280433 ||  || — || December 27, 2003 || Socorro || LINEAR || — || align=right | 2.9 km || 
|-id=434 bgcolor=#d6d6d6
| 280434 ||  || — || December 28, 2003 || Socorro || LINEAR || — || align=right | 5.8 km || 
|-id=435 bgcolor=#d6d6d6
| 280435 ||  || — || December 28, 2003 || Socorro || LINEAR || EUP || align=right | 4.4 km || 
|-id=436 bgcolor=#d6d6d6
| 280436 ||  || — || December 28, 2003 || Socorro || LINEAR || — || align=right | 4.9 km || 
|-id=437 bgcolor=#fefefe
| 280437 ||  || — || December 28, 2003 || Socorro || LINEAR || — || align=right | 1.0 km || 
|-id=438 bgcolor=#d6d6d6
| 280438 ||  || — || December 17, 2003 || Kitt Peak || Spacewatch || KOR || align=right | 2.1 km || 
|-id=439 bgcolor=#d6d6d6
| 280439 ||  || — || December 18, 2003 || Socorro || LINEAR || EOS || align=right | 3.1 km || 
|-id=440 bgcolor=#d6d6d6
| 280440 ||  || — || January 13, 2004 || Anderson Mesa || LONEOS || ALA || align=right | 5.3 km || 
|-id=441 bgcolor=#d6d6d6
| 280441 ||  || — || January 23, 2004 || Socorro || LINEAR || — || align=right | 4.4 km || 
|-id=442 bgcolor=#fefefe
| 280442 ||  || — || January 29, 2004 || Socorro || LINEAR || PHO || align=right | 1.6 km || 
|-id=443 bgcolor=#d6d6d6
| 280443 ||  || — || January 24, 2004 || Socorro || LINEAR || EMA || align=right | 4.7 km || 
|-id=444 bgcolor=#fefefe
| 280444 ||  || — || January 30, 2004 || Anderson Mesa || LONEOS || — || align=right | 1.2 km || 
|-id=445 bgcolor=#d6d6d6
| 280445 ||  || — || January 16, 2004 || Kitt Peak || Spacewatch || — || align=right | 2.9 km || 
|-id=446 bgcolor=#d6d6d6
| 280446 ||  || — || February 14, 2004 || Jonathan B. Postel || Jonathan B. Postel Obs. || — || align=right | 4.7 km || 
|-id=447 bgcolor=#d6d6d6
| 280447 ||  || — || February 15, 2004 || Socorro || LINEAR || — || align=right | 3.6 km || 
|-id=448 bgcolor=#E9E9E9
| 280448 ||  || — || February 11, 2004 || Palomar || NEAT || HOF || align=right | 3.9 km || 
|-id=449 bgcolor=#fefefe
| 280449 ||  || — || February 14, 2004 || Palomar || NEAT || — || align=right | 1.0 km || 
|-id=450 bgcolor=#d6d6d6
| 280450 ||  || — || February 14, 2004 || Kitt Peak || Spacewatch || — || align=right | 3.6 km || 
|-id=451 bgcolor=#fefefe
| 280451 ||  || — || February 16, 2004 || Kitt Peak || Spacewatch || FLO || align=right data-sort-value="0.84" | 840 m || 
|-id=452 bgcolor=#fefefe
| 280452 ||  || — || February 16, 2004 || Socorro || LINEAR || — || align=right data-sort-value="0.86" | 860 m || 
|-id=453 bgcolor=#fefefe
| 280453 ||  || — || February 16, 2004 || Kitt Peak || Spacewatch || FLO || align=right data-sort-value="0.77" | 770 m || 
|-id=454 bgcolor=#fefefe
| 280454 ||  || — || March 11, 2004 || Palomar || NEAT || — || align=right data-sort-value="0.99" | 990 m || 
|-id=455 bgcolor=#fefefe
| 280455 ||  || — || March 12, 2004 || Palomar || NEAT || — || align=right data-sort-value="0.92" | 920 m || 
|-id=456 bgcolor=#fefefe
| 280456 ||  || — || March 15, 2004 || Kitt Peak || Spacewatch || — || align=right | 1.1 km || 
|-id=457 bgcolor=#fefefe
| 280457 ||  || — || March 15, 2004 || Kitt Peak || Spacewatch || FLO || align=right data-sort-value="0.67" | 670 m || 
|-id=458 bgcolor=#fefefe
| 280458 ||  || — || March 15, 2004 || Kitt Peak || Spacewatch || MAS || align=right data-sort-value="0.78" | 780 m || 
|-id=459 bgcolor=#fefefe
| 280459 ||  || — || March 15, 2004 || Socorro || LINEAR || — || align=right | 1.2 km || 
|-id=460 bgcolor=#fefefe
| 280460 ||  || — || March 15, 2004 || Socorro || LINEAR || — || align=right data-sort-value="0.99" | 990 m || 
|-id=461 bgcolor=#fefefe
| 280461 ||  || — || March 16, 2004 || Catalina || CSS || FLO || align=right data-sort-value="0.85" | 850 m || 
|-id=462 bgcolor=#fefefe
| 280462 ||  || — || March 19, 2004 || Socorro || LINEAR || — || align=right | 1.2 km || 
|-id=463 bgcolor=#fefefe
| 280463 ||  || — || March 19, 2004 || Kitt Peak || Spacewatch || — || align=right data-sort-value="0.95" | 950 m || 
|-id=464 bgcolor=#fefefe
| 280464 ||  || — || March 22, 2004 || Socorro || LINEAR || — || align=right data-sort-value="0.95" | 950 m || 
|-id=465 bgcolor=#fefefe
| 280465 ||  || — || March 18, 2004 || Socorro || LINEAR || — || align=right | 1.1 km || 
|-id=466 bgcolor=#fefefe
| 280466 ||  || — || March 21, 2004 || Nogales || Tenagra II Obs. || — || align=right | 1.1 km || 
|-id=467 bgcolor=#fefefe
| 280467 ||  || — || March 23, 2004 || Socorro || LINEAR || FLO || align=right data-sort-value="0.79" | 790 m || 
|-id=468 bgcolor=#fefefe
| 280468 ||  || — || March 23, 2004 || Socorro || LINEAR || FLO || align=right data-sort-value="0.96" | 960 m || 
|-id=469 bgcolor=#fefefe
| 280469 ||  || — || April 12, 2004 || Kitt Peak || Spacewatch || — || align=right | 1.1 km || 
|-id=470 bgcolor=#fefefe
| 280470 ||  || — || April 14, 2004 || Kitt Peak || Spacewatch || — || align=right | 1.3 km || 
|-id=471 bgcolor=#fefefe
| 280471 ||  || — || April 14, 2004 || Kitt Peak || Spacewatch || — || align=right data-sort-value="0.79" | 790 m || 
|-id=472 bgcolor=#fefefe
| 280472 ||  || — || April 12, 2004 || Kitt Peak || Spacewatch || FLO || align=right | 1.00 km || 
|-id=473 bgcolor=#fefefe
| 280473 ||  || — || April 13, 2004 || Kitt Peak || Spacewatch || FLO || align=right data-sort-value="0.96" | 960 m || 
|-id=474 bgcolor=#fefefe
| 280474 ||  || — || April 16, 2004 || Socorro || LINEAR || — || align=right | 1.0 km || 
|-id=475 bgcolor=#fefefe
| 280475 ||  || — || April 16, 2004 || Socorro || LINEAR || — || align=right | 1.3 km || 
|-id=476 bgcolor=#fefefe
| 280476 ||  || — || April 16, 2004 || Palomar || NEAT || — || align=right | 1.3 km || 
|-id=477 bgcolor=#fefefe
| 280477 ||  || — || April 19, 2004 || Socorro || LINEAR || FLO || align=right data-sort-value="0.95" | 950 m || 
|-id=478 bgcolor=#fefefe
| 280478 ||  || — || April 21, 2004 || Catalina || CSS || — || align=right data-sort-value="0.87" | 870 m || 
|-id=479 bgcolor=#fefefe
| 280479 ||  || — || April 19, 2004 || Socorro || LINEAR || — || align=right | 1.0 km || 
|-id=480 bgcolor=#fefefe
| 280480 ||  || — || April 21, 2004 || Socorro || LINEAR || FLO || align=right data-sort-value="0.77" | 770 m || 
|-id=481 bgcolor=#FA8072
| 280481 ||  || — || April 22, 2004 || Siding Spring || SSS || — || align=right | 1.8 km || 
|-id=482 bgcolor=#fefefe
| 280482 ||  || — || April 25, 2004 || Kitt Peak || Spacewatch || — || align=right data-sort-value="0.98" | 980 m || 
|-id=483 bgcolor=#fefefe
| 280483 ||  || — || May 13, 2004 || Socorro || LINEAR || — || align=right | 3.5 km || 
|-id=484 bgcolor=#fefefe
| 280484 ||  || — || May 15, 2004 || Socorro || LINEAR || — || align=right data-sort-value="0.97" | 970 m || 
|-id=485 bgcolor=#fefefe
| 280485 ||  || — || June 11, 2004 || Palomar || NEAT || FLO || align=right data-sort-value="0.83" | 830 m || 
|-id=486 bgcolor=#fefefe
| 280486 ||  || — || June 12, 2004 || Socorro || LINEAR || — || align=right | 1.2 km || 
|-id=487 bgcolor=#fefefe
| 280487 ||  || — || June 14, 2004 || Kitt Peak || Spacewatch || FLO || align=right data-sort-value="0.88" | 880 m || 
|-id=488 bgcolor=#FA8072
| 280488 ||  || — || June 12, 2004 || Anderson Mesa || LONEOS || — || align=right | 1.5 km || 
|-id=489 bgcolor=#fefefe
| 280489 ||  || — || June 22, 2004 || Kitt Peak || Spacewatch || FLO || align=right data-sort-value="0.90" | 900 m || 
|-id=490 bgcolor=#fefefe
| 280490 ||  || — || June 25, 2004 || Kitt Peak || Spacewatch || — || align=right | 1.1 km || 
|-id=491 bgcolor=#FFC2E0
| 280491 ||  || — || June 16, 2004 || Mauna Kea || D. J. Tholen || APOcritical || align=right data-sort-value="0.57" | 570 m || 
|-id=492 bgcolor=#fefefe
| 280492 ||  || — || July 9, 2004 || Siding Spring || SSS || NYS || align=right data-sort-value="0.77" | 770 m || 
|-id=493 bgcolor=#fefefe
| 280493 ||  || — || July 9, 2004 || Palomar || NEAT || — || align=right | 1.2 km || 
|-id=494 bgcolor=#fefefe
| 280494 ||  || — || July 9, 2004 || Socorro || LINEAR || NYS || align=right data-sort-value="0.88" | 880 m || 
|-id=495 bgcolor=#fefefe
| 280495 ||  || — || July 11, 2004 || Socorro || LINEAR || NYS || align=right data-sort-value="0.79" | 790 m || 
|-id=496 bgcolor=#fefefe
| 280496 ||  || — || July 14, 2004 || Socorro || LINEAR || V || align=right data-sort-value="0.90" | 900 m || 
|-id=497 bgcolor=#fefefe
| 280497 ||  || — || July 14, 2004 || Socorro || LINEAR || ERI || align=right | 1.8 km || 
|-id=498 bgcolor=#FA8072
| 280498 ||  || — || July 11, 2004 || Socorro || LINEAR || — || align=right data-sort-value="0.94" | 940 m || 
|-id=499 bgcolor=#fefefe
| 280499 ||  || — || July 11, 2004 || Palomar || NEAT || — || align=right | 1.4 km || 
|-id=500 bgcolor=#E9E9E9
| 280500 ||  || — || July 17, 2004 || Socorro || LINEAR || EUN || align=right | 1.8 km || 
|}

280501–280600 

|-bgcolor=#fefefe
| 280501 ||  || — || July 21, 2004 || Reedy Creek || J. Broughton || NYS || align=right data-sort-value="0.74" | 740 m || 
|-id=502 bgcolor=#fefefe
| 280502 ||  || — || August 3, 2004 || Siding Spring || SSS || NYS || align=right data-sort-value="0.85" | 850 m || 
|-id=503 bgcolor=#fefefe
| 280503 ||  || — || August 3, 2004 || Siding Spring || SSS || MAS || align=right data-sort-value="0.82" | 820 m || 
|-id=504 bgcolor=#fefefe
| 280504 ||  || — || August 6, 2004 || Palomar || NEAT || V || align=right data-sort-value="0.87" | 870 m || 
|-id=505 bgcolor=#fefefe
| 280505 ||  || — || August 6, 2004 || Palomar || NEAT || — || align=right | 1.1 km || 
|-id=506 bgcolor=#fefefe
| 280506 ||  || — || August 6, 2004 || Palomar || NEAT || NYS || align=right data-sort-value="0.70" | 700 m || 
|-id=507 bgcolor=#fefefe
| 280507 ||  || — || August 6, 2004 || Palomar || NEAT || — || align=right | 1.0 km || 
|-id=508 bgcolor=#fefefe
| 280508 ||  || — || August 7, 2004 || Palomar || NEAT || NYS || align=right data-sort-value="0.71" | 710 m || 
|-id=509 bgcolor=#fefefe
| 280509 ||  || — || August 7, 2004 || Palomar || NEAT || MAS || align=right | 1.0 km || 
|-id=510 bgcolor=#fefefe
| 280510 ||  || — || August 8, 2004 || Socorro || LINEAR || NYS || align=right data-sort-value="0.87" | 870 m || 
|-id=511 bgcolor=#fefefe
| 280511 ||  || — || August 8, 2004 || Socorro || LINEAR || MAS || align=right | 1.0 km || 
|-id=512 bgcolor=#fefefe
| 280512 ||  || — || August 8, 2004 || Reedy Creek || J. Broughton || — || align=right | 1.1 km || 
|-id=513 bgcolor=#fefefe
| 280513 ||  || — || August 5, 2004 || Palomar || NEAT || FLO || align=right data-sort-value="0.80" | 800 m || 
|-id=514 bgcolor=#fefefe
| 280514 ||  || — || August 8, 2004 || Socorro || LINEAR || — || align=right | 1.2 km || 
|-id=515 bgcolor=#fefefe
| 280515 ||  || — || August 10, 2004 || Socorro || LINEAR || MAS || align=right data-sort-value="0.71" | 710 m || 
|-id=516 bgcolor=#fefefe
| 280516 ||  || — || August 7, 2004 || Palomar || NEAT || FLO || align=right data-sort-value="0.79" | 790 m || 
|-id=517 bgcolor=#fefefe
| 280517 ||  || — || August 8, 2004 || Palomar || NEAT || NYS || align=right data-sort-value="0.72" | 720 m || 
|-id=518 bgcolor=#fefefe
| 280518 ||  || — || August 9, 2004 || Socorro || LINEAR || — || align=right | 1.1 km || 
|-id=519 bgcolor=#fefefe
| 280519 ||  || — || August 9, 2004 || Socorro || LINEAR || — || align=right data-sort-value="0.78" | 780 m || 
|-id=520 bgcolor=#fefefe
| 280520 ||  || — || August 10, 2004 || Socorro || LINEAR || — || align=right | 1.0 km || 
|-id=521 bgcolor=#E9E9E9
| 280521 ||  || — || August 10, 2004 || Socorro || LINEAR || BRU || align=right | 3.6 km || 
|-id=522 bgcolor=#fefefe
| 280522 ||  || — || August 11, 2004 || Socorro || LINEAR || NYS || align=right data-sort-value="0.82" | 820 m || 
|-id=523 bgcolor=#fefefe
| 280523 ||  || — || August 12, 2004 || Palomar || NEAT || — || align=right | 1.1 km || 
|-id=524 bgcolor=#fefefe
| 280524 ||  || — || August 9, 2004 || Socorro || LINEAR || NYScritical || align=right data-sort-value="0.83" | 830 m || 
|-id=525 bgcolor=#fefefe
| 280525 ||  || — || August 7, 2004 || Palomar || NEAT || MAScritical || align=right data-sort-value="0.86" | 860 m || 
|-id=526 bgcolor=#fefefe
| 280526 ||  || — || August 11, 2004 || Socorro || LINEAR || — || align=right | 1.0 km || 
|-id=527 bgcolor=#d6d6d6
| 280527 ||  || — || August 21, 2004 || Catalina || CSS || HIL3:2 || align=right | 8.5 km || 
|-id=528 bgcolor=#fefefe
| 280528 ||  || — || August 21, 2004 || Siding Spring || SSS || V || align=right data-sort-value="0.90" | 900 m || 
|-id=529 bgcolor=#fefefe
| 280529 ||  || — || August 23, 2004 || Kitt Peak || Spacewatch || NYS || align=right data-sort-value="0.77" | 770 m || 
|-id=530 bgcolor=#fefefe
| 280530 ||  || — || August 18, 2004 || Siding Spring || SSS || — || align=right | 1.2 km || 
|-id=531 bgcolor=#fefefe
| 280531 ||  || — || September 8, 2004 || Socorro || LINEAR || V || align=right data-sort-value="0.87" | 870 m || 
|-id=532 bgcolor=#fefefe
| 280532 ||  || — || September 6, 2004 || Bergisch Gladbac || W. Bickel || NYS || align=right data-sort-value="0.66" | 660 m || 
|-id=533 bgcolor=#fefefe
| 280533 ||  || — || September 6, 2004 || Siding Spring || SSS || MAS || align=right | 1.0 km || 
|-id=534 bgcolor=#fefefe
| 280534 ||  || — || September 6, 2004 || Palomar || NEAT || MAS || align=right data-sort-value="0.90" | 900 m || 
|-id=535 bgcolor=#fefefe
| 280535 ||  || — || September 7, 2004 || Kitt Peak || Spacewatch || NYS || align=right data-sort-value="0.69" | 690 m || 
|-id=536 bgcolor=#E9E9E9
| 280536 ||  || — || September 8, 2004 || Socorro || LINEAR || WIT || align=right | 1.7 km || 
|-id=537 bgcolor=#fefefe
| 280537 ||  || — || September 8, 2004 || Socorro || LINEAR || NYS || align=right data-sort-value="0.88" | 880 m || 
|-id=538 bgcolor=#fefefe
| 280538 ||  || — || September 8, 2004 || Socorro || LINEAR || — || align=right | 1.4 km || 
|-id=539 bgcolor=#fefefe
| 280539 ||  || — || September 8, 2004 || Socorro || LINEAR || MAS || align=right data-sort-value="0.86" | 860 m || 
|-id=540 bgcolor=#fefefe
| 280540 ||  || — || September 8, 2004 || Socorro || LINEAR || NYS || align=right data-sort-value="0.91" | 910 m || 
|-id=541 bgcolor=#fefefe
| 280541 ||  || — || September 8, 2004 || Socorro || LINEAR || MAS || align=right data-sort-value="0.93" | 930 m || 
|-id=542 bgcolor=#fefefe
| 280542 ||  || — || September 7, 2004 || Socorro || LINEAR || — || align=right data-sort-value="0.90" | 900 m || 
|-id=543 bgcolor=#fefefe
| 280543 ||  || — || September 8, 2004 || Socorro || LINEAR || — || align=right data-sort-value="0.77" | 770 m || 
|-id=544 bgcolor=#E9E9E9
| 280544 ||  || — || September 8, 2004 || Socorro || LINEAR || — || align=right | 1.6 km || 
|-id=545 bgcolor=#fefefe
| 280545 ||  || — || September 7, 2004 || Kitt Peak || Spacewatch || NYS || align=right data-sort-value="0.67" | 670 m || 
|-id=546 bgcolor=#E9E9E9
| 280546 ||  || — || September 8, 2004 || Palomar || NEAT || — || align=right | 1.7 km || 
|-id=547 bgcolor=#fefefe
| 280547 ||  || — || September 7, 2004 || Socorro || LINEAR || MAS || align=right data-sort-value="0.85" | 850 m || 
|-id=548 bgcolor=#fefefe
| 280548 ||  || — || September 10, 2004 || Socorro || LINEAR || H || align=right data-sort-value="0.62" | 620 m || 
|-id=549 bgcolor=#fefefe
| 280549 ||  || — || September 11, 2004 || Kitt Peak || Spacewatch || V || align=right | 1.00 km || 
|-id=550 bgcolor=#fefefe
| 280550 ||  || — || September 11, 2004 || Socorro || LINEAR || KLI || align=right | 3.5 km || 
|-id=551 bgcolor=#E9E9E9
| 280551 ||  || — || September 8, 2004 || Socorro || LINEAR || — || align=right | 1.2 km || 
|-id=552 bgcolor=#E9E9E9
| 280552 ||  || — || September 9, 2004 || Kitt Peak || Spacewatch || HNS || align=right | 2.6 km || 
|-id=553 bgcolor=#fefefe
| 280553 ||  || — || September 10, 2004 || Kitt Peak || Spacewatch || — || align=right | 1.1 km || 
|-id=554 bgcolor=#E9E9E9
| 280554 ||  || — || September 10, 2004 || Kitt Peak || Spacewatch || — || align=right data-sort-value="0.89" | 890 m || 
|-id=555 bgcolor=#fefefe
| 280555 ||  || — || September 15, 2004 || Socorro || LINEAR || — || align=right | 1.4 km || 
|-id=556 bgcolor=#fefefe
| 280556 ||  || — || September 11, 2004 || Socorro || LINEAR || MAS || align=right data-sort-value="0.96" | 960 m || 
|-id=557 bgcolor=#E9E9E9
| 280557 ||  || — || September 12, 2004 || Socorro || LINEAR || JUN || align=right | 1.7 km || 
|-id=558 bgcolor=#fefefe
| 280558 ||  || — || September 13, 2004 || Kitt Peak || Spacewatch || — || align=right | 1.1 km || 
|-id=559 bgcolor=#fefefe
| 280559 ||  || — || September 14, 2004 || Palomar || NEAT || — || align=right | 1.1 km || 
|-id=560 bgcolor=#E9E9E9
| 280560 ||  || — || September 11, 2004 || Palomar || NEAT || — || align=right | 2.5 km || 
|-id=561 bgcolor=#fefefe
| 280561 ||  || — || September 15, 2004 || Kitt Peak || Spacewatch || — || align=right | 1.2 km || 
|-id=562 bgcolor=#fefefe
| 280562 ||  || — || September 8, 2004 || Socorro || LINEAR || NYS || align=right data-sort-value="0.91" | 910 m || 
|-id=563 bgcolor=#E9E9E9
| 280563 ||  || — || September 17, 2004 || Anderson Mesa || LONEOS || KON || align=right | 3.8 km || 
|-id=564 bgcolor=#fefefe
| 280564 ||  || — || October 4, 2004 || Kitt Peak || Spacewatch || MAS || align=right data-sort-value="0.92" | 920 m || 
|-id=565 bgcolor=#E9E9E9
| 280565 ||  || — || October 4, 2004 || Kitt Peak || Spacewatch || — || align=right data-sort-value="0.93" | 930 m || 
|-id=566 bgcolor=#E9E9E9
| 280566 ||  || — || October 4, 2004 || Kitt Peak || Spacewatch || — || align=right data-sort-value="0.87" | 870 m || 
|-id=567 bgcolor=#fefefe
| 280567 ||  || — || October 8, 2004 || Socorro || LINEAR || H || align=right data-sort-value="0.88" | 880 m || 
|-id=568 bgcolor=#fefefe
| 280568 ||  || — || October 4, 2004 || Kitt Peak || Spacewatch || NYS || align=right data-sort-value="0.72" | 720 m || 
|-id=569 bgcolor=#E9E9E9
| 280569 ||  || — || October 4, 2004 || Kitt Peak || Spacewatch || — || align=right | 1.2 km || 
|-id=570 bgcolor=#E9E9E9
| 280570 ||  || — || October 4, 2004 || Kitt Peak || Spacewatch || — || align=right | 2.3 km || 
|-id=571 bgcolor=#E9E9E9
| 280571 ||  || — || October 4, 2004 || Kitt Peak || Spacewatch || — || align=right | 3.8 km || 
|-id=572 bgcolor=#E9E9E9
| 280572 ||  || — || October 4, 2004 || Kitt Peak || Spacewatch || — || align=right | 1.1 km || 
|-id=573 bgcolor=#E9E9E9
| 280573 ||  || — || October 4, 2004 || Kitt Peak || Spacewatch || — || align=right | 1.4 km || 
|-id=574 bgcolor=#E9E9E9
| 280574 ||  || — || October 5, 2004 || Kitt Peak || Spacewatch || — || align=right | 1.3 km || 
|-id=575 bgcolor=#E9E9E9
| 280575 ||  || — || October 7, 2004 || Anderson Mesa || LONEOS || — || align=right | 2.0 km || 
|-id=576 bgcolor=#E9E9E9
| 280576 ||  || — || October 7, 2004 || Anderson Mesa || LONEOS || — || align=right | 1.5 km || 
|-id=577 bgcolor=#E9E9E9
| 280577 ||  || — || October 9, 2004 || Socorro || LINEAR || EUN || align=right | 1.9 km || 
|-id=578 bgcolor=#E9E9E9
| 280578 ||  || — || October 7, 2004 || Kitt Peak || Spacewatch || — || align=right data-sort-value="0.99" | 990 m || 
|-id=579 bgcolor=#E9E9E9
| 280579 ||  || — || October 7, 2004 || Kitt Peak || Spacewatch || HEN || align=right data-sort-value="0.99" | 990 m || 
|-id=580 bgcolor=#E9E9E9
| 280580 ||  || — || October 7, 2004 || Kitt Peak || Spacewatch || — || align=right | 1.0 km || 
|-id=581 bgcolor=#E9E9E9
| 280581 ||  || — || October 6, 2004 || Palomar || NEAT || — || align=right | 1.3 km || 
|-id=582 bgcolor=#E9E9E9
| 280582 ||  || — || October 8, 2004 || Kitt Peak || Spacewatch || JUN || align=right | 1.4 km || 
|-id=583 bgcolor=#fefefe
| 280583 ||  || — || October 6, 2004 || Socorro || LINEAR || — || align=right | 3.2 km || 
|-id=584 bgcolor=#E9E9E9
| 280584 ||  || — || October 10, 2004 || Kitt Peak || Spacewatch || — || align=right data-sort-value="0.99" | 990 m || 
|-id=585 bgcolor=#E9E9E9
| 280585 ||  || — || October 11, 2004 || Kitt Peak || Spacewatch || — || align=right | 1.8 km || 
|-id=586 bgcolor=#E9E9E9
| 280586 ||  || — || October 4, 2004 || Palomar || NEAT || — || align=right | 1.3 km || 
|-id=587 bgcolor=#E9E9E9
| 280587 ||  || — || October 14, 2004 || Kitt Peak || Spacewatch || — || align=right | 1.5 km || 
|-id=588 bgcolor=#E9E9E9
| 280588 ||  || — || October 15, 2004 || Socorro || LINEAR || EUN || align=right | 1.5 km || 
|-id=589 bgcolor=#E9E9E9
| 280589 ||  || — || October 7, 2004 || Kitt Peak || Spacewatch || slow || align=right | 3.0 km || 
|-id=590 bgcolor=#fefefe
| 280590 ||  || — || October 18, 2004 || Goodricke-Pigott || Goodricke-Pigott Obs. || H || align=right data-sort-value="0.86" | 860 m || 
|-id=591 bgcolor=#E9E9E9
| 280591 ||  || — || November 3, 2004 || Anderson Mesa || LONEOS || — || align=right | 3.1 km || 
|-id=592 bgcolor=#E9E9E9
| 280592 ||  || — || November 3, 2004 || Palomar || NEAT || — || align=right | 2.6 km || 
|-id=593 bgcolor=#E9E9E9
| 280593 ||  || — || November 4, 2004 || Anderson Mesa || LONEOS || — || align=right | 1.3 km || 
|-id=594 bgcolor=#E9E9E9
| 280594 ||  || — || November 4, 2004 || Anderson Mesa || LONEOS || — || align=right | 1.5 km || 
|-id=595 bgcolor=#E9E9E9
| 280595 ||  || — || November 4, 2004 || Catalina || CSS || — || align=right | 1.5 km || 
|-id=596 bgcolor=#E9E9E9
| 280596 ||  || — || November 3, 2004 || Kitt Peak || Spacewatch || — || align=right | 3.2 km || 
|-id=597 bgcolor=#fefefe
| 280597 ||  || — || November 3, 2004 || Anderson Mesa || LONEOS || H || align=right data-sort-value="0.79" | 790 m || 
|-id=598 bgcolor=#E9E9E9
| 280598 ||  || — || November 4, 2004 || Kitt Peak || Spacewatch || — || align=right | 2.3 km || 
|-id=599 bgcolor=#E9E9E9
| 280599 ||  || — || November 4, 2004 || Kitt Peak || Spacewatch || — || align=right | 1.1 km || 
|-id=600 bgcolor=#E9E9E9
| 280600 ||  || — || November 7, 2004 || Socorro || LINEAR || — || align=right | 2.2 km || 
|}

280601–280700 

|-bgcolor=#E9E9E9
| 280601 ||  || — || November 12, 2004 || Catalina || CSS || — || align=right | 1.4 km || 
|-id=602 bgcolor=#E9E9E9
| 280602 ||  || — || November 12, 2004 || Catalina || CSS || — || align=right | 1.9 km || 
|-id=603 bgcolor=#E9E9E9
| 280603 ||  || — || November 4, 2004 || Kitt Peak || Spacewatch || — || align=right | 1.4 km || 
|-id=604 bgcolor=#E9E9E9
| 280604 ||  || — || November 10, 2004 || Kitt Peak || Spacewatch || EUN || align=right | 1.5 km || 
|-id=605 bgcolor=#E9E9E9
| 280605 ||  || — || November 17, 2004 || Campo Imperatore || CINEOS || GEF || align=right | 1.6 km || 
|-id=606 bgcolor=#E9E9E9
| 280606 ||  || — || November 18, 2004 || Campo Imperatore || CINEOS || IAN || align=right | 1.3 km || 
|-id=607 bgcolor=#E9E9E9
| 280607 ||  || — || November 30, 2004 || Palomar || NEAT || GER || align=right | 1.8 km || 
|-id=608 bgcolor=#FA8072
| 280608 ||  || — || December 1, 2004 || Socorro || LINEAR || H || align=right data-sort-value="0.97" | 970 m || 
|-id=609 bgcolor=#E9E9E9
| 280609 ||  || — || December 7, 2004 || Nakagawa || Nakagawa Obs. || NEM || align=right | 3.0 km || 
|-id=610 bgcolor=#E9E9E9
| 280610 ||  || — || December 2, 2004 || Palomar || NEAT || — || align=right | 3.7 km || 
|-id=611 bgcolor=#E9E9E9
| 280611 ||  || — || December 8, 2004 || Socorro || LINEAR || HNS || align=right | 1.7 km || 
|-id=612 bgcolor=#E9E9E9
| 280612 ||  || — || December 8, 2004 || Socorro || LINEAR || DOR || align=right | 2.5 km || 
|-id=613 bgcolor=#E9E9E9
| 280613 ||  || — || December 9, 2004 || Kitt Peak || Spacewatch || — || align=right | 3.4 km || 
|-id=614 bgcolor=#E9E9E9
| 280614 ||  || — || December 9, 2004 || Kitt Peak || Spacewatch || EUN || align=right | 1.8 km || 
|-id=615 bgcolor=#fefefe
| 280615 ||  || — || December 12, 2004 || Socorro || LINEAR || H || align=right data-sort-value="0.91" | 910 m || 
|-id=616 bgcolor=#d6d6d6
| 280616 ||  || — || December 10, 2004 || Socorro || LINEAR || — || align=right | 4.4 km || 
|-id=617 bgcolor=#E9E9E9
| 280617 ||  || — || December 15, 2004 || Junk Bond || Junk Bond Obs. || — || align=right | 2.4 km || 
|-id=618 bgcolor=#E9E9E9
| 280618 ||  || — || December 2, 2004 || Palomar || NEAT || — || align=right | 2.6 km || 
|-id=619 bgcolor=#E9E9E9
| 280619 ||  || — || December 10, 2004 || Socorro || LINEAR || — || align=right | 1.5 km || 
|-id=620 bgcolor=#E9E9E9
| 280620 ||  || — || December 11, 2004 || Kitt Peak || Spacewatch || NEM || align=right | 3.1 km || 
|-id=621 bgcolor=#E9E9E9
| 280621 ||  || — || December 11, 2004 || Kitt Peak || Spacewatch || — || align=right | 1.7 km || 
|-id=622 bgcolor=#d6d6d6
| 280622 ||  || — || December 13, 2004 || Kitt Peak || Spacewatch || — || align=right | 2.4 km || 
|-id=623 bgcolor=#E9E9E9
| 280623 ||  || — || December 11, 2004 || Kitt Peak || Spacewatch || — || align=right | 4.0 km || 
|-id=624 bgcolor=#E9E9E9
| 280624 ||  || — || December 12, 2004 || Kitt Peak || Spacewatch || — || align=right | 1.4 km || 
|-id=625 bgcolor=#E9E9E9
| 280625 ||  || — || December 9, 2004 || Catalina || CSS || — || align=right | 2.6 km || 
|-id=626 bgcolor=#d6d6d6
| 280626 ||  || — || December 10, 2004 || Kitt Peak || Spacewatch || HYG || align=right | 3.2 km || 
|-id=627 bgcolor=#d6d6d6
| 280627 ||  || — || December 10, 2004 || Kitt Peak || Spacewatch || — || align=right | 4.2 km || 
|-id=628 bgcolor=#E9E9E9
| 280628 ||  || — || December 14, 2004 || Kitt Peak || Spacewatch || — || align=right | 2.0 km || 
|-id=629 bgcolor=#E9E9E9
| 280629 ||  || — || December 14, 2004 || Socorro || LINEAR || — || align=right | 1.9 km || 
|-id=630 bgcolor=#E9E9E9
| 280630 ||  || — || December 2, 2004 || Kitt Peak || Spacewatch || PAD || align=right | 2.8 km || 
|-id=631 bgcolor=#d6d6d6
| 280631 ||  || — || December 14, 2004 || Campo Imperatore || CINEOS || — || align=right | 4.5 km || 
|-id=632 bgcolor=#fefefe
| 280632 ||  || — || December 14, 2004 || Socorro || LINEAR || H || align=right data-sort-value="0.79" | 790 m || 
|-id=633 bgcolor=#E9E9E9
| 280633 ||  || — || December 15, 2004 || Socorro || LINEAR || — || align=right | 2.9 km || 
|-id=634 bgcolor=#d6d6d6
| 280634 ||  || — || December 11, 2004 || Kitt Peak || Spacewatch || — || align=right | 3.8 km || 
|-id=635 bgcolor=#E9E9E9
| 280635 ||  || — || December 19, 2004 || Junk Bond || Junk Bond Obs. || — || align=right | 2.1 km || 
|-id=636 bgcolor=#E9E9E9
| 280636 ||  || — || December 18, 2004 || Mount Lemmon || Mount Lemmon Survey || — || align=right | 1.4 km || 
|-id=637 bgcolor=#E9E9E9
| 280637 ||  || — || December 18, 2004 || Mount Lemmon || Mount Lemmon Survey || ADE || align=right | 2.6 km || 
|-id=638 bgcolor=#E9E9E9
| 280638 ||  || — || December 16, 2004 || Anderson Mesa || LONEOS || — || align=right | 3.5 km || 
|-id=639 bgcolor=#E9E9E9
| 280639 ||  || — || January 4, 2005 || Great Shefford || P. Birtwhistle || — || align=right | 1.3 km || 
|-id=640 bgcolor=#E9E9E9
| 280640 Ruetsch ||  ||  || January 4, 2005 || Vicques || M. Ory || WIT || align=right | 1.4 km || 
|-id=641 bgcolor=#E9E9E9
| 280641 Edosara ||  ||  || January 6, 2005 || San Marcello || L. Tesi, G. Fagioli || — || align=right | 2.6 km || 
|-id=642 bgcolor=#d6d6d6
| 280642 Doubs ||  ||  || January 13, 2005 || Vicques || M. Ory || — || align=right | 3.1 km || 
|-id=643 bgcolor=#d6d6d6
| 280643 ||  || — || January 13, 2005 || Kitt Peak || Spacewatch || — || align=right | 5.1 km || 
|-id=644 bgcolor=#E9E9E9
| 280644 ||  || — || January 13, 2005 || Kitt Peak || Spacewatch || HOF || align=right | 3.1 km || 
|-id=645 bgcolor=#d6d6d6
| 280645 ||  || — || January 15, 2005 || Kitt Peak || Spacewatch || — || align=right | 4.7 km || 
|-id=646 bgcolor=#E9E9E9
| 280646 ||  || — || January 16, 2005 || Kitt Peak || Spacewatch || PAD || align=right | 2.8 km || 
|-id=647 bgcolor=#E9E9E9
| 280647 ||  || — || January 17, 2005 || Kitt Peak || Spacewatch || — || align=right | 2.8 km || 
|-id=648 bgcolor=#E9E9E9
| 280648 ||  || — || January 16, 2005 || Kitt Peak || Spacewatch || HOF || align=right | 3.1 km || 
|-id=649 bgcolor=#E9E9E9
| 280649 ||  || — || January 16, 2005 || Kitt Peak || Spacewatch || HOF || align=right | 3.3 km || 
|-id=650 bgcolor=#E9E9E9
| 280650 ||  || — || January 18, 2005 || Catalina || CSS || HNS || align=right | 1.8 km || 
|-id=651 bgcolor=#E9E9E9
| 280651 ||  || — || January 16, 2005 || Mauna Kea || C. Veillet || — || align=right | 2.2 km || 
|-id=652 bgcolor=#fefefe
| 280652 Aimaku || 2005 CQ ||  || February 2, 2005 || San Marcello || L. Tesi, G. Fagioli || H || align=right data-sort-value="0.75" | 750 m || 
|-id=653 bgcolor=#d6d6d6
| 280653 ||  || — || February 1, 2005 || Catalina || CSS || — || align=right | 5.6 km || 
|-id=654 bgcolor=#d6d6d6
| 280654 ||  || — || February 1, 2005 || Kitt Peak || Spacewatch || — || align=right | 2.7 km || 
|-id=655 bgcolor=#d6d6d6
| 280655 ||  || — || February 1, 2005 || Kitt Peak || Spacewatch || EOS || align=right | 2.3 km || 
|-id=656 bgcolor=#E9E9E9
| 280656 ||  || — || March 1, 2005 || Kitt Peak || Spacewatch || AGN || align=right | 1.5 km || 
|-id=657 bgcolor=#d6d6d6
| 280657 ||  || — || March 1, 2005 || Kitt Peak || Spacewatch || THM || align=right | 2.6 km || 
|-id=658 bgcolor=#d6d6d6
| 280658 ||  || — || March 3, 2005 || Kitt Peak || Spacewatch || THM || align=right | 2.7 km || 
|-id=659 bgcolor=#d6d6d6
| 280659 ||  || — || March 3, 2005 || Catalina || CSS || SAN || align=right | 2.1 km || 
|-id=660 bgcolor=#fefefe
| 280660 ||  || — || March 3, 2005 || Catalina || CSS || ERI || align=right | 2.7 km || 
|-id=661 bgcolor=#d6d6d6
| 280661 ||  || — || March 4, 2005 || Socorro || LINEAR || — || align=right | 2.3 km || 
|-id=662 bgcolor=#d6d6d6
| 280662 ||  || — || March 3, 2005 || Kitt Peak || Spacewatch || KOR || align=right | 1.7 km || 
|-id=663 bgcolor=#d6d6d6
| 280663 ||  || — || March 4, 2005 || Kitt Peak || Spacewatch || EOS || align=right | 1.8 km || 
|-id=664 bgcolor=#d6d6d6
| 280664 ||  || — || March 4, 2005 || Mount Lemmon || Mount Lemmon Survey || — || align=right | 6.2 km || 
|-id=665 bgcolor=#d6d6d6
| 280665 ||  || — || March 4, 2005 || Catalina || CSS || TIR || align=right | 4.0 km || 
|-id=666 bgcolor=#d6d6d6
| 280666 ||  || — || March 8, 2005 || Kitt Peak || Spacewatch || — || align=right | 5.1 km || 
|-id=667 bgcolor=#d6d6d6
| 280667 ||  || — || March 9, 2005 || Mount Lemmon || Mount Lemmon Survey || — || align=right | 4.7 km || 
|-id=668 bgcolor=#d6d6d6
| 280668 ||  || — || March 10, 2005 || Kitt Peak || Spacewatch || — || align=right | 3.8 km || 
|-id=669 bgcolor=#d6d6d6
| 280669 ||  || — || March 10, 2005 || Kitt Peak || Spacewatch || EOS || align=right | 2.8 km || 
|-id=670 bgcolor=#d6d6d6
| 280670 ||  || — || March 9, 2005 || Catalina || CSS || — || align=right | 3.7 km || 
|-id=671 bgcolor=#d6d6d6
| 280671 ||  || — || March 9, 2005 || Mount Lemmon || Mount Lemmon Survey || — || align=right | 3.5 km || 
|-id=672 bgcolor=#d6d6d6
| 280672 ||  || — || March 9, 2005 || Mount Lemmon || Mount Lemmon Survey || — || align=right | 5.0 km || 
|-id=673 bgcolor=#d6d6d6
| 280673 ||  || — || March 10, 2005 || Mount Lemmon || Mount Lemmon Survey || — || align=right | 2.5 km || 
|-id=674 bgcolor=#d6d6d6
| 280674 ||  || — || March 7, 2005 || Socorro || LINEAR || — || align=right | 5.6 km || 
|-id=675 bgcolor=#d6d6d6
| 280675 ||  || — || March 8, 2005 || Mount Lemmon || Mount Lemmon Survey || — || align=right | 3.2 km || 
|-id=676 bgcolor=#d6d6d6
| 280676 ||  || — || March 9, 2005 || Kitt Peak || Spacewatch || — || align=right | 4.9 km || 
|-id=677 bgcolor=#d6d6d6
| 280677 ||  || — || March 9, 2005 || Siding Spring || SSS || — || align=right | 4.3 km || 
|-id=678 bgcolor=#d6d6d6
| 280678 ||  || — || March 4, 2005 || Kitt Peak || Spacewatch || HYG || align=right | 2.8 km || 
|-id=679 bgcolor=#d6d6d6
| 280679 ||  || — || March 12, 2005 || Socorro || LINEAR || — || align=right | 5.4 km || 
|-id=680 bgcolor=#d6d6d6
| 280680 ||  || — || March 11, 2005 || Anderson Mesa || LONEOS || EUP || align=right | 5.9 km || 
|-id=681 bgcolor=#d6d6d6
| 280681 ||  || — || March 9, 2005 || Socorro || LINEAR || — || align=right | 3.9 km || 
|-id=682 bgcolor=#d6d6d6
| 280682 ||  || — || March 10, 2005 || Anderson Mesa || LONEOS || — || align=right | 3.8 km || 
|-id=683 bgcolor=#d6d6d6
| 280683 ||  || — || March 10, 2005 || Mount Lemmon || Mount Lemmon Survey || 637 || align=right | 2.8 km || 
|-id=684 bgcolor=#d6d6d6
| 280684 ||  || — || March 11, 2005 || Catalina || CSS || — || align=right | 3.0 km || 
|-id=685 bgcolor=#d6d6d6
| 280685 ||  || — || March 12, 2005 || Kitt Peak || Spacewatch || — || align=right | 2.4 km || 
|-id=686 bgcolor=#d6d6d6
| 280686 ||  || — || March 13, 2005 || Moletai || Molėtai Obs. || — || align=right | 3.4 km || 
|-id=687 bgcolor=#d6d6d6
| 280687 ||  || — || March 14, 2005 || Mount Lemmon || Mount Lemmon Survey || — || align=right | 2.9 km || 
|-id=688 bgcolor=#d6d6d6
| 280688 ||  || — || March 8, 2005 || Mount Lemmon || Mount Lemmon Survey || VER || align=right | 6.0 km || 
|-id=689 bgcolor=#d6d6d6
| 280689 ||  || — || March 10, 2005 || Catalina || CSS || — || align=right | 4.3 km || 
|-id=690 bgcolor=#d6d6d6
| 280690 ||  || — || March 12, 2005 || Kitt Peak || M. W. Buie || THM || align=right | 3.7 km || 
|-id=691 bgcolor=#d6d6d6
| 280691 ||  || — || March 4, 2005 || Catalina || CSS || TIR || align=right | 3.4 km || 
|-id=692 bgcolor=#E9E9E9
| 280692 ||  || — || March 1, 2005 || Catalina || CSS || EUN || align=right | 1.7 km || 
|-id=693 bgcolor=#d6d6d6
| 280693 ||  || — || March 15, 2005 || Catalina || CSS || — || align=right | 3.3 km || 
|-id=694 bgcolor=#d6d6d6
| 280694 ||  || — || March 30, 2005 || Catalina || CSS || LIX || align=right | 5.9 km || 
|-id=695 bgcolor=#d6d6d6
| 280695 ||  || — || March 18, 2005 || Catalina || CSS || EOS || align=right | 2.8 km || 
|-id=696 bgcolor=#d6d6d6
| 280696 ||  || — || April 1, 2005 || Kitt Peak || Spacewatch || — || align=right | 3.4 km || 
|-id=697 bgcolor=#d6d6d6
| 280697 ||  || — || April 1, 2005 || Kitt Peak || Spacewatch || — || align=right | 2.3 km || 
|-id=698 bgcolor=#d6d6d6
| 280698 ||  || — || April 1, 2005 || Catalina || CSS || EUP || align=right | 5.9 km || 
|-id=699 bgcolor=#d6d6d6
| 280699 ||  || — || April 2, 2005 || Mount Lemmon || Mount Lemmon Survey || — || align=right | 3.3 km || 
|-id=700 bgcolor=#d6d6d6
| 280700 ||  || — || April 4, 2005 || Kitt Peak || Spacewatch || — || align=right | 4.1 km || 
|}

280701–280800 

|-bgcolor=#d6d6d6
| 280701 ||  || — || April 2, 2005 || Catalina || CSS || — || align=right | 4.3 km || 
|-id=702 bgcolor=#d6d6d6
| 280702 ||  || — || April 4, 2005 || Catalina || CSS || — || align=right | 3.7 km || 
|-id=703 bgcolor=#d6d6d6
| 280703 ||  || — || April 5, 2005 || Mount Lemmon || Mount Lemmon Survey || EOS || align=right | 2.5 km || 
|-id=704 bgcolor=#d6d6d6
| 280704 ||  || — || April 5, 2005 || Mount Lemmon || Mount Lemmon Survey || — || align=right | 2.9 km || 
|-id=705 bgcolor=#E9E9E9
| 280705 ||  || — || April 6, 2005 || Mount Lemmon || Mount Lemmon Survey || — || align=right | 1.3 km || 
|-id=706 bgcolor=#d6d6d6
| 280706 ||  || — || April 6, 2005 || Mount Lemmon || Mount Lemmon Survey || THM || align=right | 3.3 km || 
|-id=707 bgcolor=#d6d6d6
| 280707 ||  || — || April 6, 2005 || Junk Bond || Junk Bond Obs. || — || align=right | 3.6 km || 
|-id=708 bgcolor=#d6d6d6
| 280708 ||  || — || April 2, 2005 || Palomar || NEAT || — || align=right | 5.1 km || 
|-id=709 bgcolor=#d6d6d6
| 280709 ||  || — || April 2, 2005 || Catalina || CSS || TIR || align=right | 2.6 km || 
|-id=710 bgcolor=#d6d6d6
| 280710 ||  || — || April 7, 2005 || Kitt Peak || Spacewatch || — || align=right | 2.8 km || 
|-id=711 bgcolor=#d6d6d6
| 280711 ||  || — || April 7, 2005 || Kitt Peak || Spacewatch || — || align=right | 4.6 km || 
|-id=712 bgcolor=#d6d6d6
| 280712 ||  || — || April 5, 2005 || Anderson Mesa || LONEOS || TIR || align=right | 3.6 km || 
|-id=713 bgcolor=#d6d6d6
| 280713 ||  || — || April 5, 2005 || Mount Lemmon || Mount Lemmon Survey || — || align=right | 4.7 km || 
|-id=714 bgcolor=#d6d6d6
| 280714 ||  || — || April 10, 2005 || Kitt Peak || Spacewatch || — || align=right | 3.2 km || 
|-id=715 bgcolor=#d6d6d6
| 280715 ||  || — || April 10, 2005 || Mount Lemmon || Mount Lemmon Survey || — || align=right | 3.9 km || 
|-id=716 bgcolor=#d6d6d6
| 280716 ||  || — || April 6, 2005 || Catalina || CSS || URS || align=right | 4.7 km || 
|-id=717 bgcolor=#d6d6d6
| 280717 ||  || — || April 11, 2005 || Kitt Peak || Spacewatch || — || align=right | 3.0 km || 
|-id=718 bgcolor=#d6d6d6
| 280718 ||  || — || April 9, 2005 || Catalina || CSS || EOS || align=right | 3.0 km || 
|-id=719 bgcolor=#d6d6d6
| 280719 ||  || — || April 10, 2005 || Catalina || CSS || EUP || align=right | 5.2 km || 
|-id=720 bgcolor=#d6d6d6
| 280720 ||  || — || April 12, 2005 || Socorro || LINEAR || — || align=right | 3.6 km || 
|-id=721 bgcolor=#d6d6d6
| 280721 ||  || — || April 12, 2005 || Mount Lemmon || Mount Lemmon Survey || — || align=right | 4.0 km || 
|-id=722 bgcolor=#d6d6d6
| 280722 ||  || — || April 13, 2005 || Siding Spring || SSS || — || align=right | 4.9 km || 
|-id=723 bgcolor=#d6d6d6
| 280723 ||  || — || April 14, 2005 || Kitt Peak || Spacewatch || THM || align=right | 2.9 km || 
|-id=724 bgcolor=#d6d6d6
| 280724 ||  || — || April 6, 2005 || Siding Spring || SSS || EUP || align=right | 7.0 km || 
|-id=725 bgcolor=#d6d6d6
| 280725 ||  || — || April 12, 2005 || Kitt Peak || Spacewatch || EOS || align=right | 2.8 km || 
|-id=726 bgcolor=#d6d6d6
| 280726 ||  || — || April 12, 2005 || Kitt Peak || Spacewatch || — || align=right | 4.5 km || 
|-id=727 bgcolor=#d6d6d6
| 280727 ||  || — || April 10, 2005 || Kitt Peak || M. W. Buie || KOR || align=right | 1.5 km || 
|-id=728 bgcolor=#d6d6d6
| 280728 ||  || — || April 4, 2005 || Catalina || CSS || LIX || align=right | 4.6 km || 
|-id=729 bgcolor=#d6d6d6
| 280729 ||  || — || April 16, 2005 || Kitt Peak || Spacewatch || — || align=right | 2.7 km || 
|-id=730 bgcolor=#d6d6d6
| 280730 ||  || — || April 27, 2005 || Cordell-Lorenz || D. T. Durig || URS || align=right | 5.4 km || 
|-id=731 bgcolor=#E9E9E9
| 280731 ||  || — || May 1, 2005 || Kitt Peak || Spacewatch || EUN || align=right | 1.6 km || 
|-id=732 bgcolor=#d6d6d6
| 280732 ||  || — || May 4, 2005 || Catalina || CSS || — || align=right | 4.4 km || 
|-id=733 bgcolor=#d6d6d6
| 280733 ||  || — || March 17, 2005 || Kitt Peak || Spacewatch || HYG || align=right | 2.8 km || 
|-id=734 bgcolor=#d6d6d6
| 280734 ||  || — || May 10, 2005 || Kitt Peak || Spacewatch || EOS || align=right | 2.5 km || 
|-id=735 bgcolor=#d6d6d6
| 280735 ||  || — || May 11, 2005 || Palomar || NEAT || — || align=right | 3.9 km || 
|-id=736 bgcolor=#d6d6d6
| 280736 ||  || — || May 9, 2005 || Kitt Peak || Spacewatch || — || align=right | 4.3 km || 
|-id=737 bgcolor=#d6d6d6
| 280737 ||  || — || May 10, 2005 || Mount Lemmon || Mount Lemmon Survey || EOS || align=right | 2.7 km || 
|-id=738 bgcolor=#d6d6d6
| 280738 ||  || — || May 13, 2005 || Kitt Peak || Spacewatch || HYG || align=right | 3.6 km || 
|-id=739 bgcolor=#d6d6d6
| 280739 ||  || — || May 15, 2005 || Palomar || NEAT || — || align=right | 4.2 km || 
|-id=740 bgcolor=#d6d6d6
| 280740 ||  || — || May 17, 2005 || Mount Lemmon || Mount Lemmon Survey || THB || align=right | 2.8 km || 
|-id=741 bgcolor=#E9E9E9
| 280741 ||  || — || June 1, 2005 || Reedy Creek || J. Broughton || — || align=right | 3.0 km || 
|-id=742 bgcolor=#FA8072
| 280742 ||  || — || June 8, 2005 || Mauna Kea || D. J. Tholen || — || align=right data-sort-value="0.55" | 550 m || 
|-id=743 bgcolor=#E9E9E9
| 280743 ||  || — || June 14, 2005 || Kitt Peak || Spacewatch || HNS || align=right | 2.0 km || 
|-id=744 bgcolor=#fefefe
| 280744 ||  || — || June 30, 2005 || Kitt Peak || Spacewatch || — || align=right data-sort-value="0.68" | 680 m || 
|-id=745 bgcolor=#d6d6d6
| 280745 ||  || — || July 2, 2005 || Kitt Peak || Spacewatch || EUP || align=right | 5.1 km || 
|-id=746 bgcolor=#fefefe
| 280746 ||  || — || July 5, 2005 || Kitt Peak || Spacewatch || — || align=right data-sort-value="0.82" | 820 m || 
|-id=747 bgcolor=#fefefe
| 280747 ||  || — || July 11, 2005 || Kitt Peak || Spacewatch || — || align=right data-sort-value="0.85" | 850 m || 
|-id=748 bgcolor=#d6d6d6
| 280748 ||  || — || July 6, 2005 || Kitt Peak || Spacewatch || SYL7:4 || align=right | 6.5 km || 
|-id=749 bgcolor=#d6d6d6
| 280749 ||  || — || July 26, 2005 || Palomar || NEAT || — || align=right | 3.8 km || 
|-id=750 bgcolor=#fefefe
| 280750 ||  || — || August 4, 2005 || Palomar || NEAT || — || align=right data-sort-value="0.77" | 770 m || 
|-id=751 bgcolor=#fefefe
| 280751 ||  || — || August 25, 2005 || Campo Imperatore || CINEOS || — || align=right data-sort-value="0.74" | 740 m || 
|-id=752 bgcolor=#fefefe
| 280752 ||  || — || August 26, 2005 || Anderson Mesa || LONEOS || — || align=right | 2.1 km || 
|-id=753 bgcolor=#fefefe
| 280753 ||  || — || August 27, 2005 || Kitt Peak || Spacewatch || — || align=right | 1.0 km || 
|-id=754 bgcolor=#fefefe
| 280754 ||  || — || August 26, 2005 || Palomar || NEAT || — || align=right data-sort-value="0.88" | 880 m || 
|-id=755 bgcolor=#fefefe
| 280755 ||  || — || August 29, 2005 || Socorro || LINEAR || — || align=right | 1.0 km || 
|-id=756 bgcolor=#fefefe
| 280756 ||  || — || August 29, 2005 || Kitt Peak || Spacewatch || V || align=right data-sort-value="0.88" | 880 m || 
|-id=757 bgcolor=#fefefe
| 280757 ||  || — || August 28, 2005 || Anderson Mesa || LONEOS || — || align=right data-sort-value="0.96" | 960 m || 
|-id=758 bgcolor=#fefefe
| 280758 ||  || — || August 29, 2005 || Anderson Mesa || LONEOS || — || align=right data-sort-value="0.75" | 750 m || 
|-id=759 bgcolor=#fefefe
| 280759 ||  || — || August 27, 2005 || Palomar || NEAT || — || align=right data-sort-value="0.96" | 960 m || 
|-id=760 bgcolor=#fefefe
| 280760 ||  || — || August 31, 2005 || Palomar || NEAT || — || align=right data-sort-value="0.96" | 960 m || 
|-id=761 bgcolor=#fefefe
| 280761 ||  || — || August 28, 2005 || Anderson Mesa || LONEOS || — || align=right | 2.3 km || 
|-id=762 bgcolor=#fefefe
| 280762 ||  || — || August 27, 2005 || Palomar || NEAT || — || align=right data-sort-value="0.94" | 940 m || 
|-id=763 bgcolor=#fefefe
| 280763 ||  || — || September 1, 2005 || Kitt Peak || Spacewatch || FLO || align=right | 1.0 km || 
|-id=764 bgcolor=#fefefe
| 280764 ||  || — || September 1, 2005 || Kitt Peak || Spacewatch || — || align=right data-sort-value="0.79" | 790 m || 
|-id=765 bgcolor=#fefefe
| 280765 ||  || — || September 14, 2005 || Kitt Peak || Spacewatch || V || align=right data-sort-value="0.84" | 840 m || 
|-id=766 bgcolor=#fefefe
| 280766 ||  || — || September 1, 2005 || Palomar || NEAT || — || align=right | 2.3 km || 
|-id=767 bgcolor=#fefefe
| 280767 ||  || — || September 24, 2005 || Kitt Peak || Spacewatch || NYS || align=right | 1.0 km || 
|-id=768 bgcolor=#d6d6d6
| 280768 ||  || — || September 24, 2005 || Kitt Peak || Spacewatch || SHU3:2 || align=right | 7.2 km || 
|-id=769 bgcolor=#fefefe
| 280769 ||  || — || September 23, 2005 || Kitt Peak || Spacewatch || V || align=right | 1.0 km || 
|-id=770 bgcolor=#fefefe
| 280770 ||  || — || September 25, 2005 || Kitt Peak || Spacewatch || FLO || align=right data-sort-value="0.89" | 890 m || 
|-id=771 bgcolor=#fefefe
| 280771 ||  || — || September 25, 2005 || Kitt Peak || Spacewatch || V || align=right data-sort-value="0.82" | 820 m || 
|-id=772 bgcolor=#fefefe
| 280772 ||  || — || September 24, 2005 || Kitt Peak || Spacewatch || — || align=right data-sort-value="0.89" | 890 m || 
|-id=773 bgcolor=#fefefe
| 280773 ||  || — || September 24, 2005 || Kitt Peak || Spacewatch || — || align=right data-sort-value="0.95" | 950 m || 
|-id=774 bgcolor=#fefefe
| 280774 ||  || — || September 26, 2005 || Kitt Peak || Spacewatch || V || align=right data-sort-value="0.89" | 890 m || 
|-id=775 bgcolor=#fefefe
| 280775 ||  || — || September 27, 2005 || Kitt Peak || Spacewatch || ERI || align=right | 2.0 km || 
|-id=776 bgcolor=#fefefe
| 280776 ||  || — || September 27, 2005 || Kitt Peak || Spacewatch || FLO || align=right | 1.1 km || 
|-id=777 bgcolor=#fefefe
| 280777 ||  || — || September 23, 2005 || Kitt Peak || Spacewatch || FLO || align=right data-sort-value="0.72" | 720 m || 
|-id=778 bgcolor=#fefefe
| 280778 ||  || — || September 26, 2005 || Palomar || NEAT || — || align=right | 1.9 km || 
|-id=779 bgcolor=#fefefe
| 280779 ||  || — || September 28, 2005 || Palomar || NEAT || — || align=right data-sort-value="0.94" | 940 m || 
|-id=780 bgcolor=#fefefe
| 280780 ||  || — || September 29, 2005 || Anderson Mesa || LONEOS || — || align=right data-sort-value="0.77" | 770 m || 
|-id=781 bgcolor=#fefefe
| 280781 ||  || — || September 29, 2005 || Anderson Mesa || LONEOS || — || align=right | 1.2 km || 
|-id=782 bgcolor=#fefefe
| 280782 ||  || — || September 29, 2005 || Anderson Mesa || LONEOS || — || align=right data-sort-value="0.79" | 790 m || 
|-id=783 bgcolor=#fefefe
| 280783 ||  || — || September 25, 2005 || Kitt Peak || Spacewatch || — || align=right data-sort-value="0.79" | 790 m || 
|-id=784 bgcolor=#fefefe
| 280784 ||  || — || September 25, 2005 || Kitt Peak || Spacewatch || NYS || align=right data-sort-value="0.90" | 900 m || 
|-id=785 bgcolor=#fefefe
| 280785 ||  || — || September 26, 2005 || Kitt Peak || Spacewatch || — || align=right data-sort-value="0.81" | 810 m || 
|-id=786 bgcolor=#d6d6d6
| 280786 ||  || — || September 29, 2005 || Kitt Peak || Spacewatch || HYG || align=right | 4.9 km || 
|-id=787 bgcolor=#fefefe
| 280787 ||  || — || September 29, 2005 || Anderson Mesa || LONEOS || — || align=right data-sort-value="0.94" | 940 m || 
|-id=788 bgcolor=#fefefe
| 280788 ||  || — || September 29, 2005 || Anderson Mesa || LONEOS || — || align=right | 1.1 km || 
|-id=789 bgcolor=#fefefe
| 280789 ||  || — || September 30, 2005 || Anderson Mesa || LONEOS || — || align=right | 1.0 km || 
|-id=790 bgcolor=#fefefe
| 280790 ||  || — || September 30, 2005 || Palomar || NEAT || FLO || align=right data-sort-value="0.75" | 750 m || 
|-id=791 bgcolor=#fefefe
| 280791 ||  || — || September 30, 2005 || Kitt Peak || Spacewatch || — || align=right data-sort-value="0.80" | 800 m || 
|-id=792 bgcolor=#fefefe
| 280792 ||  || — || September 23, 2005 || Anderson Mesa || LONEOS || V || align=right data-sort-value="0.76" | 760 m || 
|-id=793 bgcolor=#fefefe
| 280793 ||  || — || September 29, 2005 || Anderson Mesa || LONEOS || — || align=right | 1.2 km || 
|-id=794 bgcolor=#fefefe
| 280794 ||  || — || October 1, 2005 || Anderson Mesa || LONEOS || FLO || align=right | 1.0 km || 
|-id=795 bgcolor=#fefefe
| 280795 ||  || — || October 1, 2005 || Socorro || LINEAR || — || align=right data-sort-value="0.91" | 910 m || 
|-id=796 bgcolor=#fefefe
| 280796 ||  || — || October 1, 2005 || Mount Lemmon || Mount Lemmon Survey || — || align=right data-sort-value="0.73" | 730 m || 
|-id=797 bgcolor=#fefefe
| 280797 ||  || — || October 1, 2005 || Mount Lemmon || Mount Lemmon Survey || MAS || align=right data-sort-value="0.87" | 870 m || 
|-id=798 bgcolor=#fefefe
| 280798 ||  || — || October 1, 2005 || Catalina || CSS || — || align=right | 1.1 km || 
|-id=799 bgcolor=#fefefe
| 280799 ||  || — || October 6, 2005 || Kitt Peak || Spacewatch || NYS || align=right data-sort-value="0.72" | 720 m || 
|-id=800 bgcolor=#fefefe
| 280800 ||  || — || October 3, 2005 || Catalina || CSS || V || align=right | 1.0 km || 
|}

280801–280900 

|-bgcolor=#fefefe
| 280801 ||  || — || October 5, 2005 || Socorro || LINEAR || — || align=right data-sort-value="0.85" | 850 m || 
|-id=802 bgcolor=#fefefe
| 280802 ||  || — || October 8, 2005 || Socorro || LINEAR || — || align=right data-sort-value="0.88" | 880 m || 
|-id=803 bgcolor=#fefefe
| 280803 ||  || — || October 4, 2005 || Mount Lemmon || Mount Lemmon Survey || V || align=right data-sort-value="0.93" | 930 m || 
|-id=804 bgcolor=#E9E9E9
| 280804 ||  || — || October 7, 2005 || Kitt Peak || Spacewatch || JUN || align=right | 1.1 km || 
|-id=805 bgcolor=#fefefe
| 280805 ||  || — || October 8, 2005 || Kitt Peak || Spacewatch || — || align=right | 1.1 km || 
|-id=806 bgcolor=#fefefe
| 280806 ||  || — || April 12, 2004 || Kitt Peak || Spacewatch || V || align=right data-sort-value="0.75" | 750 m || 
|-id=807 bgcolor=#fefefe
| 280807 ||  || — || October 9, 2005 || Kitt Peak || Spacewatch || — || align=right data-sort-value="0.73" | 730 m || 
|-id=808 bgcolor=#fefefe
| 280808 ||  || — || October 9, 2005 || Kitt Peak || Spacewatch || MAS || align=right data-sort-value="0.94" | 940 m || 
|-id=809 bgcolor=#fefefe
| 280809 ||  || — || October 10, 2005 || Kitt Peak || Spacewatch || V || align=right data-sort-value="0.94" | 940 m || 
|-id=810 bgcolor=#fefefe
| 280810 ||  || — || September 15, 2005 || Catalina || CSS || — || align=right data-sort-value="0.85" | 850 m || 
|-id=811 bgcolor=#fefefe
| 280811 ||  || — || October 7, 2005 || Kitt Peak || Spacewatch || NYS || align=right data-sort-value="0.58" | 580 m || 
|-id=812 bgcolor=#d6d6d6
| 280812 ||  || — || October 1, 2005 || Catalina || CSS || HYG || align=right | 3.1 km || 
|-id=813 bgcolor=#fefefe
| 280813 ||  || — || October 26, 2005 || Ottmarsheim || C. Rinner || V || align=right data-sort-value="0.84" | 840 m || 
|-id=814 bgcolor=#fefefe
| 280814 ||  || — || October 20, 2005 || Palomar || NEAT || — || align=right | 1.0 km || 
|-id=815 bgcolor=#E9E9E9
| 280815 ||  || — || October 22, 2005 || Kitt Peak || Spacewatch || — || align=right | 1.7 km || 
|-id=816 bgcolor=#fefefe
| 280816 ||  || — || October 22, 2005 || Kitt Peak || Spacewatch || FLO || align=right data-sort-value="0.97" | 970 m || 
|-id=817 bgcolor=#fefefe
| 280817 ||  || — || October 23, 2005 || Kitt Peak || Spacewatch || — || align=right data-sort-value="0.98" | 980 m || 
|-id=818 bgcolor=#fefefe
| 280818 ||  || — || October 24, 2005 || Kitt Peak || Spacewatch || FLO || align=right data-sort-value="0.82" | 820 m || 
|-id=819 bgcolor=#fefefe
| 280819 ||  || — || October 24, 2005 || Kitt Peak || Spacewatch || — || align=right data-sort-value="0.78" | 780 m || 
|-id=820 bgcolor=#fefefe
| 280820 ||  || — || October 23, 2005 || Catalina || CSS || — || align=right | 1.4 km || 
|-id=821 bgcolor=#fefefe
| 280821 ||  || — || October 23, 2005 || Catalina || CSS || V || align=right data-sort-value="0.83" | 830 m || 
|-id=822 bgcolor=#fefefe
| 280822 ||  || — || October 23, 2005 || Catalina || CSS || — || align=right | 1.0 km || 
|-id=823 bgcolor=#fefefe
| 280823 ||  || — || October 23, 2005 || Catalina || CSS || — || align=right | 1.9 km || 
|-id=824 bgcolor=#E9E9E9
| 280824 ||  || — || October 23, 2005 || Catalina || CSS || — || align=right | 2.2 km || 
|-id=825 bgcolor=#fefefe
| 280825 ||  || — || October 25, 2005 || Mount Lemmon || Mount Lemmon Survey || NYS || align=right data-sort-value="0.87" | 870 m || 
|-id=826 bgcolor=#fefefe
| 280826 ||  || — || October 22, 2005 || Kitt Peak || Spacewatch || V || align=right data-sort-value="0.82" | 820 m || 
|-id=827 bgcolor=#fefefe
| 280827 ||  || — || October 23, 2005 || Palomar || NEAT || — || align=right | 1.1 km || 
|-id=828 bgcolor=#fefefe
| 280828 ||  || — || October 23, 2005 || Catalina || CSS || V || align=right | 1.00 km || 
|-id=829 bgcolor=#fefefe
| 280829 ||  || — || October 22, 2005 || Kitt Peak || Spacewatch || V || align=right data-sort-value="0.89" | 890 m || 
|-id=830 bgcolor=#fefefe
| 280830 ||  || — || October 22, 2005 || Kitt Peak || Spacewatch || — || align=right | 1.1 km || 
|-id=831 bgcolor=#fefefe
| 280831 ||  || — || October 22, 2005 || Kitt Peak || Spacewatch || V || align=right data-sort-value="0.98" | 980 m || 
|-id=832 bgcolor=#fefefe
| 280832 ||  || — || October 22, 2005 || Kitt Peak || Spacewatch || — || align=right data-sort-value="0.87" | 870 m || 
|-id=833 bgcolor=#fefefe
| 280833 ||  || — || October 23, 2005 || Catalina || CSS || — || align=right data-sort-value="0.95" | 950 m || 
|-id=834 bgcolor=#fefefe
| 280834 ||  || — || October 24, 2005 || Kitt Peak || Spacewatch || NYS || align=right data-sort-value="0.66" | 660 m || 
|-id=835 bgcolor=#fefefe
| 280835 ||  || — || October 24, 2005 || Palomar || NEAT || — || align=right | 1.9 km || 
|-id=836 bgcolor=#fefefe
| 280836 ||  || — || October 26, 2005 || Kitt Peak || Spacewatch || — || align=right data-sort-value="0.98" | 980 m || 
|-id=837 bgcolor=#fefefe
| 280837 ||  || — || October 26, 2005 || Kitt Peak || Spacewatch || — || align=right | 1.0 km || 
|-id=838 bgcolor=#fefefe
| 280838 ||  || — || October 26, 2005 || Kitt Peak || Spacewatch || — || align=right data-sort-value="0.68" | 680 m || 
|-id=839 bgcolor=#fefefe
| 280839 ||  || — || October 22, 2005 || Catalina || CSS || — || align=right data-sort-value="0.98" | 980 m || 
|-id=840 bgcolor=#fefefe
| 280840 ||  || — || October 22, 2005 || Palomar || NEAT || FLO || align=right data-sort-value="0.70" | 700 m || 
|-id=841 bgcolor=#fefefe
| 280841 ||  || — || October 24, 2005 || Kitt Peak || Spacewatch || — || align=right data-sort-value="0.91" | 910 m || 
|-id=842 bgcolor=#fefefe
| 280842 ||  || — || October 24, 2005 || Kitt Peak || Spacewatch || — || align=right | 1.6 km || 
|-id=843 bgcolor=#fefefe
| 280843 ||  || — || October 24, 2005 || Kitt Peak || Spacewatch || MAS || align=right data-sort-value="0.94" | 940 m || 
|-id=844 bgcolor=#E9E9E9
| 280844 ||  || — || October 27, 2005 || Mount Lemmon || Mount Lemmon Survey || — || align=right data-sort-value="0.94" | 940 m || 
|-id=845 bgcolor=#fefefe
| 280845 ||  || — || October 24, 2005 || Kitt Peak || Spacewatch || — || align=right | 1.0 km || 
|-id=846 bgcolor=#fefefe
| 280846 ||  || — || October 22, 2005 || Catalina || CSS || V || align=right data-sort-value="0.81" | 810 m || 
|-id=847 bgcolor=#fefefe
| 280847 ||  || — || October 25, 2005 || Kitt Peak || Spacewatch || — || align=right | 1.1 km || 
|-id=848 bgcolor=#fefefe
| 280848 ||  || — || October 25, 2005 || Kitt Peak || Spacewatch || — || align=right data-sort-value="0.94" | 940 m || 
|-id=849 bgcolor=#fefefe
| 280849 ||  || — || October 26, 2005 || Kitt Peak || Spacewatch || — || align=right data-sort-value="0.87" | 870 m || 
|-id=850 bgcolor=#fefefe
| 280850 ||  || — || October 27, 2005 || Kitt Peak || Spacewatch || — || align=right | 1.1 km || 
|-id=851 bgcolor=#fefefe
| 280851 ||  || — || October 28, 2005 || Mount Lemmon || Mount Lemmon Survey || MAS || align=right data-sort-value="0.78" | 780 m || 
|-id=852 bgcolor=#fefefe
| 280852 ||  || — || October 28, 2005 || Mount Lemmon || Mount Lemmon Survey || MAS || align=right data-sort-value="0.97" | 970 m || 
|-id=853 bgcolor=#FA8072
| 280853 ||  || — || October 26, 2005 || Kitt Peak || Spacewatch || — || align=right data-sort-value="0.74" | 740 m || 
|-id=854 bgcolor=#fefefe
| 280854 ||  || — || October 26, 2005 || Kitt Peak || Spacewatch || NYS || align=right data-sort-value="0.70" | 700 m || 
|-id=855 bgcolor=#E9E9E9
| 280855 ||  || — || October 26, 2005 || Kitt Peak || Spacewatch || — || align=right data-sort-value="0.87" | 870 m || 
|-id=856 bgcolor=#fefefe
| 280856 ||  || — || October 26, 2005 || Kitt Peak || Spacewatch || MAS || align=right data-sort-value="0.88" | 880 m || 
|-id=857 bgcolor=#d6d6d6
| 280857 ||  || — || October 26, 2005 || Kitt Peak || Spacewatch || EOS || align=right | 2.3 km || 
|-id=858 bgcolor=#fefefe
| 280858 ||  || — || October 28, 2005 || Catalina || CSS || FLO || align=right data-sort-value="0.70" | 700 m || 
|-id=859 bgcolor=#fefefe
| 280859 ||  || — || October 28, 2005 || Mount Lemmon || Mount Lemmon Survey || MAS || align=right data-sort-value="0.84" | 840 m || 
|-id=860 bgcolor=#fefefe
| 280860 ||  || — || October 30, 2005 || Kitt Peak || Spacewatch || MAS || align=right data-sort-value="0.82" | 820 m || 
|-id=861 bgcolor=#fefefe
| 280861 ||  || — || October 27, 2005 || Kitt Peak || Spacewatch || — || align=right data-sort-value="0.98" | 980 m || 
|-id=862 bgcolor=#fefefe
| 280862 ||  || — || October 27, 2005 || Kitt Peak || Spacewatch || V || align=right data-sort-value="0.94" | 940 m || 
|-id=863 bgcolor=#fefefe
| 280863 ||  || — || October 30, 2005 || Mount Lemmon || Mount Lemmon Survey || — || align=right data-sort-value="0.83" | 830 m || 
|-id=864 bgcolor=#fefefe
| 280864 ||  || — || October 28, 2005 || Kitt Peak || Spacewatch || FLO || align=right data-sort-value="0.84" | 840 m || 
|-id=865 bgcolor=#fefefe
| 280865 ||  || — || October 30, 2005 || Palomar || NEAT || V || align=right data-sort-value="0.74" | 740 m || 
|-id=866 bgcolor=#fefefe
| 280866 ||  || — || October 28, 2005 || Mount Lemmon || Mount Lemmon Survey || — || align=right | 1.3 km || 
|-id=867 bgcolor=#fefefe
| 280867 ||  || — || October 22, 2005 || Palomar || NEAT || — || align=right data-sort-value="0.89" | 890 m || 
|-id=868 bgcolor=#E9E9E9
| 280868 ||  || — || October 25, 2005 || Catalina || CSS || — || align=right | 2.1 km || 
|-id=869 bgcolor=#fefefe
| 280869 ||  || — || October 27, 2005 || Catalina || CSS || — || align=right data-sort-value="0.98" | 980 m || 
|-id=870 bgcolor=#fefefe
| 280870 ||  || — || October 28, 2005 || Mount Lemmon || Mount Lemmon Survey || — || align=right | 1.1 km || 
|-id=871 bgcolor=#E9E9E9
| 280871 ||  || — || November 3, 2005 || Mount Lemmon || Mount Lemmon Survey || — || align=right | 2.4 km || 
|-id=872 bgcolor=#fefefe
| 280872 ||  || — || November 3, 2005 || Mount Lemmon || Mount Lemmon Survey || — || align=right data-sort-value="0.88" | 880 m || 
|-id=873 bgcolor=#fefefe
| 280873 ||  || — || November 4, 2005 || Catalina || CSS || V || align=right data-sort-value="0.89" | 890 m || 
|-id=874 bgcolor=#fefefe
| 280874 ||  || — || November 1, 2005 || Mount Lemmon || Mount Lemmon Survey || V || align=right data-sort-value="0.92" | 920 m || 
|-id=875 bgcolor=#fefefe
| 280875 ||  || — || November 3, 2005 || Catalina || CSS || FLO || align=right data-sort-value="0.66" | 660 m || 
|-id=876 bgcolor=#fefefe
| 280876 ||  || — || November 5, 2005 || Kitt Peak || Spacewatch || — || align=right data-sort-value="0.98" | 980 m || 
|-id=877 bgcolor=#fefefe
| 280877 ||  || — || November 6, 2005 || Kitt Peak || Spacewatch || — || align=right | 1.0 km || 
|-id=878 bgcolor=#E9E9E9
| 280878 ||  || — || November 6, 2005 || Mount Lemmon || Mount Lemmon Survey || — || align=right data-sort-value="0.94" | 940 m || 
|-id=879 bgcolor=#E9E9E9
| 280879 ||  || — || November 23, 2005 || Ottmarsheim || C. Rinner || — || align=right | 2.3 km || 
|-id=880 bgcolor=#fefefe
| 280880 ||  || — || November 21, 2005 || Catalina || CSS || NYS || align=right data-sort-value="0.66" | 660 m || 
|-id=881 bgcolor=#fefefe
| 280881 ||  || — || November 22, 2005 || Kitt Peak || Spacewatch || — || align=right data-sort-value="0.87" | 870 m || 
|-id=882 bgcolor=#E9E9E9
| 280882 ||  || — || November 22, 2005 || Kitt Peak || Spacewatch || — || align=right | 3.6 km || 
|-id=883 bgcolor=#fefefe
| 280883 ||  || — || November 21, 2005 || Kitt Peak || Spacewatch || — || align=right data-sort-value="0.86" | 860 m || 
|-id=884 bgcolor=#fefefe
| 280884 ||  || — || November 22, 2005 || Kitt Peak || Spacewatch || MAS || align=right data-sort-value="0.81" | 810 m || 
|-id=885 bgcolor=#fefefe
| 280885 ||  || — || November 25, 2005 || Mount Lemmon || Mount Lemmon Survey || V || align=right data-sort-value="0.90" | 900 m || 
|-id=886 bgcolor=#d6d6d6
| 280886 ||  || — || November 25, 2005 || Mount Lemmon || Mount Lemmon Survey || EOS || align=right | 3.2 km || 
|-id=887 bgcolor=#fefefe
| 280887 ||  || — || November 28, 2005 || Catalina || CSS || V || align=right data-sort-value="0.80" | 800 m || 
|-id=888 bgcolor=#fefefe
| 280888 ||  || — || November 25, 2005 || Kitt Peak || Spacewatch || MAS || align=right data-sort-value="0.76" | 760 m || 
|-id=889 bgcolor=#fefefe
| 280889 ||  || — || November 30, 2005 || Mount Lemmon || Mount Lemmon Survey || ERI || align=right | 1.8 km || 
|-id=890 bgcolor=#E9E9E9
| 280890 ||  || — || November 25, 2005 || Mount Lemmon || Mount Lemmon Survey || — || align=right | 3.0 km || 
|-id=891 bgcolor=#fefefe
| 280891 ||  || — || November 26, 2005 || Mount Lemmon || Mount Lemmon Survey || — || align=right data-sort-value="0.74" | 740 m || 
|-id=892 bgcolor=#fefefe
| 280892 ||  || — || November 28, 2005 || Mount Lemmon || Mount Lemmon Survey || NYS || align=right data-sort-value="0.68" | 680 m || 
|-id=893 bgcolor=#fefefe
| 280893 ||  || — || November 30, 2005 || Kitt Peak || Spacewatch || — || align=right | 1.1 km || 
|-id=894 bgcolor=#fefefe
| 280894 ||  || — || November 30, 2005 || Mount Lemmon || Mount Lemmon Survey || MAS || align=right data-sort-value="0.95" | 950 m || 
|-id=895 bgcolor=#fefefe
| 280895 ||  || — || November 25, 2005 || Catalina || CSS || FLO || align=right data-sort-value="0.84" | 840 m || 
|-id=896 bgcolor=#E9E9E9
| 280896 ||  || — || November 29, 2005 || Kitt Peak || Spacewatch || — || align=right | 1.9 km || 
|-id=897 bgcolor=#E9E9E9
| 280897 ||  || — || November 21, 2005 || Catalina || CSS || — || align=right | 2.6 km || 
|-id=898 bgcolor=#fefefe
| 280898 ||  || — || December 2, 2005 || Socorro || LINEAR || — || align=right | 1.1 km || 
|-id=899 bgcolor=#fefefe
| 280899 ||  || — || December 1, 2005 || Palomar || NEAT || FLO || align=right data-sort-value="0.78" | 780 m || 
|-id=900 bgcolor=#fefefe
| 280900 ||  || — || December 2, 2005 || Mount Lemmon || Mount Lemmon Survey || LCI || align=right | 1.2 km || 
|}

280901–281000 

|-bgcolor=#E9E9E9
| 280901 ||  || — || December 1, 2005 || Kitt Peak || Spacewatch || — || align=right | 3.4 km || 
|-id=902 bgcolor=#fefefe
| 280902 ||  || — || December 5, 2005 || Mount Lemmon || Mount Lemmon Survey || — || align=right | 1.1 km || 
|-id=903 bgcolor=#E9E9E9
| 280903 ||  || — || December 7, 2005 || Kitt Peak || Spacewatch || — || align=right | 1.3 km || 
|-id=904 bgcolor=#E9E9E9
| 280904 ||  || — || December 7, 2005 || Catalina || CSS || — || align=right | 3.9 km || 
|-id=905 bgcolor=#fefefe
| 280905 ||  || — || December 2, 2005 || Mount Lemmon || Mount Lemmon Survey || MAS || align=right data-sort-value="0.87" | 870 m || 
|-id=906 bgcolor=#fefefe
| 280906 ||  || — || December 23, 2005 || Kitt Peak || Spacewatch || ERI || align=right | 2.1 km || 
|-id=907 bgcolor=#E9E9E9
| 280907 ||  || — || December 24, 2005 || Kitt Peak || Spacewatch || ADE || align=right | 2.5 km || 
|-id=908 bgcolor=#fefefe
| 280908 ||  || — || December 25, 2005 || Kitt Peak || Spacewatch || NYS || align=right data-sort-value="0.73" | 730 m || 
|-id=909 bgcolor=#d6d6d6
| 280909 ||  || — || December 21, 2005 || Catalina || CSS || — || align=right | 3.5 km || 
|-id=910 bgcolor=#fefefe
| 280910 ||  || — || December 22, 2005 || Kitt Peak || Spacewatch || V || align=right data-sort-value="0.78" | 780 m || 
|-id=911 bgcolor=#fefefe
| 280911 ||  || — || December 22, 2005 || Kitt Peak || Spacewatch || MAS || align=right | 1.1 km || 
|-id=912 bgcolor=#fefefe
| 280912 ||  || — || December 25, 2005 || Kitt Peak || Spacewatch || — || align=right | 1.2 km || 
|-id=913 bgcolor=#fefefe
| 280913 ||  || — || December 25, 2005 || Kitt Peak || Spacewatch || — || align=right | 1.1 km || 
|-id=914 bgcolor=#fefefe
| 280914 ||  || — || December 25, 2005 || Mount Lemmon || Mount Lemmon Survey || — || align=right data-sort-value="0.86" | 860 m || 
|-id=915 bgcolor=#E9E9E9
| 280915 ||  || — || December 27, 2005 || Mount Lemmon || Mount Lemmon Survey || — || align=right data-sort-value="0.92" | 920 m || 
|-id=916 bgcolor=#E9E9E9
| 280916 ||  || — || December 29, 2005 || Socorro || LINEAR || — || align=right | 3.6 km || 
|-id=917 bgcolor=#E9E9E9
| 280917 ||  || — || December 29, 2005 || Palomar || NEAT || — || align=right | 1.3 km || 
|-id=918 bgcolor=#fefefe
| 280918 ||  || — || December 26, 2005 || Mount Lemmon || Mount Lemmon Survey || V || align=right data-sort-value="0.89" | 890 m || 
|-id=919 bgcolor=#E9E9E9
| 280919 ||  || — || December 25, 2005 || Catalina || CSS || — || align=right | 1.8 km || 
|-id=920 bgcolor=#E9E9E9
| 280920 ||  || — || December 30, 2005 || Kitt Peak || Spacewatch || — || align=right | 1.4 km || 
|-id=921 bgcolor=#d6d6d6
| 280921 ||  || — || January 7, 2006 || Anderson Mesa || LONEOS || — || align=right | 4.0 km || 
|-id=922 bgcolor=#fefefe
| 280922 ||  || — || January 5, 2006 || Mount Lemmon || Mount Lemmon Survey || NYS || align=right data-sort-value="0.79" | 790 m || 
|-id=923 bgcolor=#fefefe
| 280923 ||  || — || January 5, 2006 || Socorro || LINEAR || V || align=right data-sort-value="0.99" | 990 m || 
|-id=924 bgcolor=#E9E9E9
| 280924 ||  || — || January 5, 2006 || Catalina || CSS || BRU || align=right | 4.1 km || 
|-id=925 bgcolor=#fefefe
| 280925 ||  || — || January 6, 2006 || Kitt Peak || Spacewatch || — || align=right data-sort-value="0.87" | 870 m || 
|-id=926 bgcolor=#fefefe
| 280926 ||  || — || January 5, 2006 || Kitt Peak || Spacewatch || — || align=right data-sort-value="0.94" | 940 m || 
|-id=927 bgcolor=#fefefe
| 280927 ||  || — || January 4, 2006 || Mount Lemmon || Mount Lemmon Survey || — || align=right data-sort-value="0.86" | 860 m || 
|-id=928 bgcolor=#E9E9E9
| 280928 ||  || — || January 5, 2006 || Kitt Peak || Spacewatch || — || align=right | 1.4 km || 
|-id=929 bgcolor=#E9E9E9
| 280929 ||  || — || January 9, 2006 || Mount Lemmon || Mount Lemmon Survey || — || align=right | 3.0 km || 
|-id=930 bgcolor=#E9E9E9
| 280930 ||  || — || January 6, 2006 || Catalina || CSS || JUN || align=right | 1.1 km || 
|-id=931 bgcolor=#E9E9E9
| 280931 ||  || — || January 5, 2006 || Catalina || CSS || — || align=right | 2.6 km || 
|-id=932 bgcolor=#d6d6d6
| 280932 ||  || — || January 20, 2006 || Kitt Peak || Spacewatch || EUP || align=right | 5.1 km || 
|-id=933 bgcolor=#fefefe
| 280933 ||  || — || January 22, 2006 || Mount Lemmon || Mount Lemmon Survey || MAS || align=right data-sort-value="0.98" | 980 m || 
|-id=934 bgcolor=#E9E9E9
| 280934 ||  || — || January 23, 2006 || Mount Lemmon || Mount Lemmon Survey || — || align=right | 1.6 km || 
|-id=935 bgcolor=#E9E9E9
| 280935 ||  || — || January 25, 2006 || Kitt Peak || Spacewatch || — || align=right | 1.5 km || 
|-id=936 bgcolor=#E9E9E9
| 280936 ||  || — || January 23, 2006 || Kitt Peak || Spacewatch || — || align=right | 1.5 km || 
|-id=937 bgcolor=#d6d6d6
| 280937 ||  || — || January 20, 2006 || Kitt Peak || Spacewatch || KOR || align=right | 1.7 km || 
|-id=938 bgcolor=#E9E9E9
| 280938 ||  || — || January 23, 2006 || Kitt Peak || Spacewatch || — || align=right | 1.9 km || 
|-id=939 bgcolor=#E9E9E9
| 280939 ||  || — || January 25, 2006 || Kitt Peak || Spacewatch || — || align=right | 1.4 km || 
|-id=940 bgcolor=#E9E9E9
| 280940 ||  || — || January 26, 2006 || Kitt Peak || Spacewatch || — || align=right | 1.8 km || 
|-id=941 bgcolor=#E9E9E9
| 280941 ||  || — || January 26, 2006 || Kitt Peak || Spacewatch || — || align=right | 2.2 km || 
|-id=942 bgcolor=#E9E9E9
| 280942 ||  || — || January 26, 2006 || Kitt Peak || Spacewatch || — || align=right | 2.0 km || 
|-id=943 bgcolor=#E9E9E9
| 280943 ||  || — || January 25, 2006 || Kitt Peak || Spacewatch || — || align=right | 1.1 km || 
|-id=944 bgcolor=#E9E9E9
| 280944 ||  || — || January 26, 2006 || Kitt Peak || Spacewatch || — || align=right | 2.5 km || 
|-id=945 bgcolor=#fefefe
| 280945 ||  || — || January 25, 2006 || Kitt Peak || Spacewatch || NYS || align=right data-sort-value="0.72" | 720 m || 
|-id=946 bgcolor=#E9E9E9
| 280946 ||  || — || January 26, 2006 || Kitt Peak || Spacewatch || — || align=right | 1.5 km || 
|-id=947 bgcolor=#E9E9E9
| 280947 ||  || — || January 23, 2006 || Socorro || LINEAR || — || align=right | 1.3 km || 
|-id=948 bgcolor=#fefefe
| 280948 ||  || — || January 26, 2006 || Catalina || CSS || — || align=right | 1.6 km || 
|-id=949 bgcolor=#E9E9E9
| 280949 ||  || — || January 25, 2006 || Kitt Peak || Spacewatch || — || align=right | 2.2 km || 
|-id=950 bgcolor=#E9E9E9
| 280950 ||  || — || January 25, 2006 || Kitt Peak || Spacewatch || — || align=right | 1.3 km || 
|-id=951 bgcolor=#d6d6d6
| 280951 ||  || — || January 25, 2006 || Kitt Peak || Spacewatch || EOS || align=right | 2.2 km || 
|-id=952 bgcolor=#E9E9E9
| 280952 ||  || — || January 27, 2006 || Mount Lemmon || Mount Lemmon Survey || — || align=right data-sort-value="0.88" | 880 m || 
|-id=953 bgcolor=#E9E9E9
| 280953 ||  || — || January 28, 2006 || Kitt Peak || Spacewatch || — || align=right | 2.1 km || 
|-id=954 bgcolor=#fefefe
| 280954 ||  || — || January 31, 2006 || Mount Lemmon || Mount Lemmon Survey || — || align=right | 1.2 km || 
|-id=955 bgcolor=#fefefe
| 280955 ||  || — || January 26, 2006 || Catalina || CSS || — || align=right data-sort-value="0.96" | 960 m || 
|-id=956 bgcolor=#E9E9E9
| 280956 ||  || — || January 30, 2006 || Kitt Peak || Spacewatch || — || align=right | 1.3 km || 
|-id=957 bgcolor=#d6d6d6
| 280957 ||  || — || January 23, 2006 || Kitt Peak || Spacewatch || CHA || align=right | 2.8 km || 
|-id=958 bgcolor=#E9E9E9
| 280958 ||  || — || January 31, 2006 || Kitt Peak || Spacewatch || — || align=right | 1.0 km || 
|-id=959 bgcolor=#E9E9E9
| 280959 ||  || — || January 31, 2006 || Kitt Peak || Spacewatch || — || align=right | 1.7 km || 
|-id=960 bgcolor=#E9E9E9
| 280960 ||  || — || January 31, 2006 || Kitt Peak || Spacewatch || — || align=right | 1.5 km || 
|-id=961 bgcolor=#E9E9E9
| 280961 ||  || — || January 26, 2006 || Catalina || CSS || — || align=right | 1.9 km || 
|-id=962 bgcolor=#E9E9E9
| 280962 ||  || — || January 26, 2006 || Catalina || CSS || GEF || align=right | 1.8 km || 
|-id=963 bgcolor=#fefefe
| 280963 ||  || — || February 2, 2006 || Kitt Peak || Spacewatch || — || align=right | 1.8 km || 
|-id=964 bgcolor=#E9E9E9
| 280964 ||  || — || February 2, 2006 || Mount Lemmon || Mount Lemmon Survey || — || align=right | 1.4 km || 
|-id=965 bgcolor=#E9E9E9
| 280965 ||  || — || February 3, 2006 || Socorro || LINEAR || — || align=right | 3.2 km || 
|-id=966 bgcolor=#E9E9E9
| 280966 ||  || — || February 2, 2006 || Catalina || CSS || — || align=right | 3.2 km || 
|-id=967 bgcolor=#E9E9E9
| 280967 || 2006 DF || — || February 20, 2006 || Mayhill || A. Lowe || — || align=right | 3.3 km || 
|-id=968 bgcolor=#E9E9E9
| 280968 ||  || — || February 20, 2006 || Mayhill || iTelescope Obs. || — || align=right | 1.3 km || 
|-id=969 bgcolor=#E9E9E9
| 280969 ||  || — || February 20, 2006 || Kitt Peak || Spacewatch || — || align=right | 1.2 km || 
|-id=970 bgcolor=#E9E9E9
| 280970 ||  || — || February 20, 2006 || Catalina || CSS || — || align=right | 2.4 km || 
|-id=971 bgcolor=#E9E9E9
| 280971 ||  || — || February 21, 2006 || Catalina || CSS || — || align=right | 2.2 km || 
|-id=972 bgcolor=#d6d6d6
| 280972 ||  || — || February 20, 2006 || Kitt Peak || Spacewatch || TEL || align=right | 1.7 km || 
|-id=973 bgcolor=#d6d6d6
| 280973 ||  || — || February 20, 2006 || Kitt Peak || Spacewatch || — || align=right | 4.9 km || 
|-id=974 bgcolor=#E9E9E9
| 280974 ||  || — || February 20, 2006 || Catalina || CSS || — || align=right | 2.3 km || 
|-id=975 bgcolor=#E9E9E9
| 280975 ||  || — || February 22, 2006 || Catalina || CSS || — || align=right | 2.0 km || 
|-id=976 bgcolor=#d6d6d6
| 280976 ||  || — || February 20, 2006 || Catalina || CSS || — || align=right | 5.3 km || 
|-id=977 bgcolor=#d6d6d6
| 280977 ||  || — || February 22, 2006 || Anderson Mesa || LONEOS || — || align=right | 3.1 km || 
|-id=978 bgcolor=#d6d6d6
| 280978 ||  || — || February 24, 2006 || Kitt Peak || Spacewatch || — || align=right | 4.3 km || 
|-id=979 bgcolor=#E9E9E9
| 280979 ||  || — || February 24, 2006 || Kitt Peak || Spacewatch || HEN || align=right data-sort-value="0.89" | 890 m || 
|-id=980 bgcolor=#fefefe
| 280980 ||  || — || February 24, 2006 || Palomar || NEAT || H || align=right data-sort-value="0.87" | 870 m || 
|-id=981 bgcolor=#E9E9E9
| 280981 ||  || — || February 21, 2006 || Catalina || CSS || MIS || align=right | 3.4 km || 
|-id=982 bgcolor=#E9E9E9
| 280982 ||  || — || February 26, 2006 || Anderson Mesa || LONEOS || — || align=right | 3.0 km || 
|-id=983 bgcolor=#E9E9E9
| 280983 ||  || — || February 21, 2006 || Mount Lemmon || Mount Lemmon Survey || — || align=right | 1.7 km || 
|-id=984 bgcolor=#E9E9E9
| 280984 ||  || — || February 24, 2006 || Kitt Peak || Spacewatch || MRX || align=right | 1.4 km || 
|-id=985 bgcolor=#E9E9E9
| 280985 ||  || — || February 24, 2006 || Kitt Peak || Spacewatch || — || align=right | 2.0 km || 
|-id=986 bgcolor=#E9E9E9
| 280986 ||  || — || February 24, 2006 || Kitt Peak || Spacewatch || HEN || align=right | 1.1 km || 
|-id=987 bgcolor=#C2FFFF
| 280987 ||  || — || February 24, 2006 || Kitt Peak || Spacewatch || L5 || align=right | 12 km || 
|-id=988 bgcolor=#E9E9E9
| 280988 ||  || — || February 24, 2006 || Kitt Peak || Spacewatch || WIT || align=right | 1.2 km || 
|-id=989 bgcolor=#E9E9E9
| 280989 ||  || — || February 24, 2006 || Kitt Peak || Spacewatch || AGN || align=right | 1.3 km || 
|-id=990 bgcolor=#E9E9E9
| 280990 ||  || — || February 24, 2006 || Kitt Peak || Spacewatch || — || align=right | 2.2 km || 
|-id=991 bgcolor=#E9E9E9
| 280991 ||  || — || February 25, 2006 || Mount Lemmon || Mount Lemmon Survey || HEN || align=right | 1.1 km || 
|-id=992 bgcolor=#E9E9E9
| 280992 ||  || — || February 25, 2006 || Kitt Peak || Spacewatch || MRX || align=right | 1.3 km || 
|-id=993 bgcolor=#E9E9E9
| 280993 ||  || — || February 25, 2006 || Kitt Peak || Spacewatch || — || align=right | 2.8 km || 
|-id=994 bgcolor=#E9E9E9
| 280994 ||  || — || February 27, 2006 || Kitt Peak || Spacewatch || — || align=right | 1.7 km || 
|-id=995 bgcolor=#E9E9E9
| 280995 ||  || — || February 27, 2006 || Kitt Peak || Spacewatch || — || align=right | 3.6 km || 
|-id=996 bgcolor=#E9E9E9
| 280996 ||  || — || February 27, 2006 || Kitt Peak || Spacewatch || — || align=right | 2.7 km || 
|-id=997 bgcolor=#d6d6d6
| 280997 ||  || — || February 24, 2006 || Anderson Mesa || LONEOS || AEG || align=right | 7.3 km || 
|-id=998 bgcolor=#E9E9E9
| 280998 ||  || — || February 25, 2006 || Kitt Peak || Spacewatch || — || align=right | 2.0 km || 
|-id=999 bgcolor=#E9E9E9
| 280999 ||  || — || February 25, 2006 || Kitt Peak || Spacewatch || — || align=right | 2.1 km || 
|-id=000 bgcolor=#E9E9E9
| 281000 ||  || — || February 25, 2006 || Kitt Peak || Spacewatch || — || align=right | 1.7 km || 
|}

References

External links 
 Discovery Circumstances: Numbered Minor Planets (280001)–(285000) (IAU Minor Planet Center)

0280